

203001–203100 

|-bgcolor=#E9E9E9
| 203001 ||  || — || November 3, 1999 || Catalina || CSS || EUN || align=right | 1.9 km || 
|-id=002 bgcolor=#E9E9E9
| 203002 ||  || — || November 9, 1999 || Anderson Mesa || LONEOS || — || align=right | 2.8 km || 
|-id=003 bgcolor=#E9E9E9
| 203003 ||  || — || November 9, 1999 || Kitt Peak || Spacewatch || HEN || align=right | 1.5 km || 
|-id=004 bgcolor=#E9E9E9
| 203004 ||  || — || November 12, 1999 || Socorro || LINEAR || WIT || align=right | 1.3 km || 
|-id=005 bgcolor=#E9E9E9
| 203005 ||  || — || November 13, 1999 || Anderson Mesa || LONEOS || JUN || align=right | 1.6 km || 
|-id=006 bgcolor=#E9E9E9
| 203006 ||  || — || November 29, 1999 || Kitt Peak || Spacewatch || — || align=right | 1.9 km || 
|-id=007 bgcolor=#E9E9E9
| 203007 ||  || — || December 6, 1999 || Socorro || LINEAR || — || align=right | 4.2 km || 
|-id=008 bgcolor=#E9E9E9
| 203008 ||  || — || December 7, 1999 || Socorro || LINEAR || — || align=right | 3.0 km || 
|-id=009 bgcolor=#E9E9E9
| 203009 ||  || — || December 7, 1999 || Socorro || LINEAR || GEF || align=right | 2.2 km || 
|-id=010 bgcolor=#E9E9E9
| 203010 ||  || — || December 12, 1999 || Socorro || LINEAR || — || align=right | 2.7 km || 
|-id=011 bgcolor=#E9E9E9
| 203011 ||  || — || December 12, 1999 || Socorro || LINEAR || — || align=right | 3.2 km || 
|-id=012 bgcolor=#E9E9E9
| 203012 ||  || — || December 12, 1999 || Socorro || LINEAR || — || align=right | 7.1 km || 
|-id=013 bgcolor=#E9E9E9
| 203013 ||  || — || December 12, 1999 || Socorro || LINEAR || — || align=right | 3.6 km || 
|-id=014 bgcolor=#E9E9E9
| 203014 ||  || — || December 2, 1999 || Anderson Mesa || LONEOS || — || align=right | 4.9 km || 
|-id=015 bgcolor=#FFC2E0
| 203015 ||  || — || December 19, 1999 || Socorro || LINEAR || AMO || align=right data-sort-value="0.70" | 700 m || 
|-id=016 bgcolor=#E9E9E9
| 203016 ||  || — || December 28, 1999 || Socorro || LINEAR || — || align=right | 3.4 km || 
|-id=017 bgcolor=#E9E9E9
| 203017 ||  || — || January 3, 2000 || Socorro || LINEAR || — || align=right | 4.1 km || 
|-id=018 bgcolor=#E9E9E9
| 203018 ||  || — || January 4, 2000 || Socorro || LINEAR || — || align=right | 5.1 km || 
|-id=019 bgcolor=#E9E9E9
| 203019 ||  || — || January 5, 2000 || Socorro || LINEAR || — || align=right | 3.5 km || 
|-id=020 bgcolor=#E9E9E9
| 203020 ||  || — || January 5, 2000 || Socorro || LINEAR || — || align=right | 4.0 km || 
|-id=021 bgcolor=#E9E9E9
| 203021 ||  || — || January 8, 2000 || Socorro || LINEAR || BRU || align=right | 6.0 km || 
|-id=022 bgcolor=#E9E9E9
| 203022 ||  || — || January 7, 2000 || Socorro || LINEAR || — || align=right | 4.4 km || 
|-id=023 bgcolor=#E9E9E9
| 203023 ||  || — || January 4, 2000 || Kitt Peak || Spacewatch || — || align=right | 3.7 km || 
|-id=024 bgcolor=#E9E9E9
| 203024 ||  || — || January 5, 2000 || Kitt Peak || Spacewatch || DOR || align=right | 3.0 km || 
|-id=025 bgcolor=#E9E9E9
| 203025 ||  || — || January 12, 2000 || Kitt Peak || Spacewatch || — || align=right | 2.7 km || 
|-id=026 bgcolor=#E9E9E9
| 203026 ||  || — || January 12, 2000 || Kitt Peak || Spacewatch || HOF || align=right | 4.5 km || 
|-id=027 bgcolor=#E9E9E9
| 203027 ||  || — || January 7, 2000 || Anderson Mesa || LONEOS || — || align=right | 2.5 km || 
|-id=028 bgcolor=#E9E9E9
| 203028 ||  || — || January 7, 2000 || Kitt Peak || Spacewatch || — || align=right | 2.2 km || 
|-id=029 bgcolor=#E9E9E9
| 203029 || 2000 BR || — || January 28, 2000 || Prescott || P. G. Comba || DOR || align=right | 4.2 km || 
|-id=030 bgcolor=#E9E9E9
| 203030 ||  || — || January 27, 2000 || Kitt Peak || Spacewatch || — || align=right | 2.8 km || 
|-id=031 bgcolor=#E9E9E9
| 203031 ||  || — || January 28, 2000 || Kitt Peak || Spacewatch || PAD || align=right | 4.2 km || 
|-id=032 bgcolor=#E9E9E9
| 203032 ||  || — || January 26, 2000 || Kitt Peak || Spacewatch || — || align=right | 3.4 km || 
|-id=033 bgcolor=#E9E9E9
| 203033 ||  || — || January 29, 2000 || Kitt Peak || Spacewatch || DOR || align=right | 4.0 km || 
|-id=034 bgcolor=#d6d6d6
| 203034 ||  || — || January 28, 2000 || Kitt Peak || Spacewatch || — || align=right | 3.7 km || 
|-id=035 bgcolor=#E9E9E9
| 203035 ||  || — || February 3, 2000 || Socorro || LINEAR || — || align=right | 2.3 km || 
|-id=036 bgcolor=#E9E9E9
| 203036 ||  || — || February 5, 2000 || Socorro || LINEAR || — || align=right | 2.7 km || 
|-id=037 bgcolor=#E9E9E9
| 203037 ||  || — || February 8, 2000 || Kitt Peak || Spacewatch || — || align=right | 4.8 km || 
|-id=038 bgcolor=#E9E9E9
| 203038 ||  || — || February 8, 2000 || Kitt Peak || Spacewatch || DOR || align=right | 4.2 km || 
|-id=039 bgcolor=#d6d6d6
| 203039 ||  || — || February 26, 2000 || Kitt Peak || Spacewatch || KOR || align=right | 1.9 km || 
|-id=040 bgcolor=#E9E9E9
| 203040 ||  || — || February 27, 2000 || Kitt Peak || Spacewatch || — || align=right | 3.8 km || 
|-id=041 bgcolor=#fefefe
| 203041 ||  || — || February 29, 2000 || Socorro || LINEAR || — || align=right data-sort-value="0.90" | 900 m || 
|-id=042 bgcolor=#E9E9E9
| 203042 ||  || — || February 29, 2000 || Socorro || LINEAR || AGN || align=right | 2.0 km || 
|-id=043 bgcolor=#E9E9E9
| 203043 ||  || — || February 29, 2000 || Socorro || LINEAR || AGN || align=right | 1.8 km || 
|-id=044 bgcolor=#E9E9E9
| 203044 ||  || — || February 26, 2000 || Kitt Peak || Spacewatch || AGN || align=right | 1.8 km || 
|-id=045 bgcolor=#E9E9E9
| 203045 ||  || — || February 27, 2000 || Kitt Peak || Spacewatch || — || align=right | 2.4 km || 
|-id=046 bgcolor=#E9E9E9
| 203046 ||  || — || March 9, 2000 || Socorro || LINEAR || — || align=right | 4.6 km || 
|-id=047 bgcolor=#d6d6d6
| 203047 ||  || — || March 3, 2000 || Kitt Peak || Spacewatch || — || align=right | 2.6 km || 
|-id=048 bgcolor=#E9E9E9
| 203048 ||  || — || March 8, 2000 || Haleakala || NEAT || — || align=right | 4.1 km || 
|-id=049 bgcolor=#d6d6d6
| 203049 ||  || — || March 9, 2000 || Kitt Peak || Spacewatch || TEL || align=right | 2.1 km || 
|-id=050 bgcolor=#E9E9E9
| 203050 ||  || — || March 11, 2000 || Anderson Mesa || LONEOS || — || align=right | 3.2 km || 
|-id=051 bgcolor=#fefefe
| 203051 ||  || — || March 3, 2000 || Socorro || LINEAR || — || align=right data-sort-value="0.90" | 900 m || 
|-id=052 bgcolor=#E9E9E9
| 203052 ||  || — || March 29, 2000 || Socorro || LINEAR || EUN || align=right | 2.1 km || 
|-id=053 bgcolor=#d6d6d6
| 203053 ||  || — || March 29, 2000 || Kitt Peak || Spacewatch || THM || align=right | 2.9 km || 
|-id=054 bgcolor=#fefefe
| 203054 ||  || — || April 5, 2000 || Socorro || LINEAR || — || align=right | 1.4 km || 
|-id=055 bgcolor=#fefefe
| 203055 ||  || — || April 5, 2000 || Socorro || LINEAR || — || align=right data-sort-value="0.76" | 760 m || 
|-id=056 bgcolor=#fefefe
| 203056 ||  || — || April 5, 2000 || Socorro || LINEAR || — || align=right | 1.0 km || 
|-id=057 bgcolor=#d6d6d6
| 203057 ||  || — || April 6, 2000 || Kitt Peak || Spacewatch || — || align=right | 2.9 km || 
|-id=058 bgcolor=#d6d6d6
| 203058 ||  || — || April 6, 2000 || Socorro || LINEAR || — || align=right | 3.3 km || 
|-id=059 bgcolor=#fefefe
| 203059 ||  || — || April 29, 2000 || Socorro || LINEAR || FLO || align=right data-sort-value="0.84" | 840 m || 
|-id=060 bgcolor=#d6d6d6
| 203060 ||  || — || April 27, 2000 || Kitt Peak || Spacewatch || — || align=right | 3.7 km || 
|-id=061 bgcolor=#d6d6d6
| 203061 ||  || — || May 9, 2000 || Kitt Peak || Spacewatch || THM || align=right | 2.9 km || 
|-id=062 bgcolor=#d6d6d6
| 203062 ||  || — || May 26, 2000 || Kitt Peak || Spacewatch || THM || align=right | 2.8 km || 
|-id=063 bgcolor=#E9E9E9
| 203063 ||  || — || May 27, 2000 || Anderson Mesa || LONEOS || — || align=right | 3.9 km || 
|-id=064 bgcolor=#fefefe
| 203064 ||  || — || July 6, 2000 || Kitt Peak || Spacewatch || — || align=right | 2.0 km || 
|-id=065 bgcolor=#fefefe
| 203065 ||  || — || July 30, 2000 || Socorro || LINEAR || PHO || align=right | 1.8 km || 
|-id=066 bgcolor=#fefefe
| 203066 ||  || — || August 1, 2000 || Socorro || LINEAR || — || align=right | 2.5 km || 
|-id=067 bgcolor=#fefefe
| 203067 ||  || — || August 1, 2000 || Socorro || LINEAR || — || align=right | 1.5 km || 
|-id=068 bgcolor=#d6d6d6
| 203068 ||  || — || August 2, 2000 || Socorro || LINEAR || — || align=right | 4.8 km || 
|-id=069 bgcolor=#fefefe
| 203069 ||  || — || August 24, 2000 || Socorro || LINEAR || MAS || align=right | 1.1 km || 
|-id=070 bgcolor=#fefefe
| 203070 ||  || — || August 24, 2000 || Socorro || LINEAR || NYS || align=right data-sort-value="0.83" | 830 m || 
|-id=071 bgcolor=#fefefe
| 203071 ||  || — || August 24, 2000 || Socorro || LINEAR || NYS || align=right | 1.0 km || 
|-id=072 bgcolor=#fefefe
| 203072 ||  || — || August 24, 2000 || Socorro || LINEAR || — || align=right | 1.3 km || 
|-id=073 bgcolor=#fefefe
| 203073 ||  || — || August 24, 2000 || Socorro || LINEAR || — || align=right | 1.0 km || 
|-id=074 bgcolor=#fefefe
| 203074 ||  || — || August 24, 2000 || Socorro || LINEAR || MAS || align=right | 1.1 km || 
|-id=075 bgcolor=#fefefe
| 203075 ||  || — || August 24, 2000 || Socorro || LINEAR || MAS || align=right | 1.1 km || 
|-id=076 bgcolor=#fefefe
| 203076 ||  || — || August 24, 2000 || Socorro || LINEAR || MAS || align=right | 1.0 km || 
|-id=077 bgcolor=#fefefe
| 203077 ||  || — || August 26, 2000 || Socorro || LINEAR || NYS || align=right data-sort-value="0.96" | 960 m || 
|-id=078 bgcolor=#fefefe
| 203078 ||  || — || August 26, 2000 || Socorro || LINEAR || NYS || align=right data-sort-value="0.95" | 950 m || 
|-id=079 bgcolor=#fefefe
| 203079 ||  || — || August 24, 2000 || Socorro || LINEAR || NYS || align=right | 1.0 km || 
|-id=080 bgcolor=#fefefe
| 203080 ||  || — || August 25, 2000 || Socorro || LINEAR || V || align=right | 1.5 km || 
|-id=081 bgcolor=#fefefe
| 203081 ||  || — || August 25, 2000 || Socorro || LINEAR || — || align=right | 1.6 km || 
|-id=082 bgcolor=#fefefe
| 203082 ||  || — || August 25, 2000 || Socorro || LINEAR || V || align=right | 1.2 km || 
|-id=083 bgcolor=#fefefe
| 203083 ||  || — || August 26, 2000 || Socorro || LINEAR || — || align=right | 1.2 km || 
|-id=084 bgcolor=#fefefe
| 203084 ||  || — || August 28, 2000 || Socorro || LINEAR || — || align=right | 1.4 km || 
|-id=085 bgcolor=#fefefe
| 203085 ||  || — || August 28, 2000 || Socorro || LINEAR || NYS || align=right | 2.2 km || 
|-id=086 bgcolor=#fefefe
| 203086 ||  || — || August 28, 2000 || Socorro || LINEAR || NYS || align=right | 1.0 km || 
|-id=087 bgcolor=#fefefe
| 203087 ||  || — || August 25, 2000 || Socorro || LINEAR || V || align=right | 1.2 km || 
|-id=088 bgcolor=#fefefe
| 203088 ||  || — || August 31, 2000 || Socorro || LINEAR || V || align=right | 1.2 km || 
|-id=089 bgcolor=#fefefe
| 203089 ||  || — || August 29, 2000 || Socorro || LINEAR || — || align=right | 1.5 km || 
|-id=090 bgcolor=#fefefe
| 203090 ||  || — || August 31, 2000 || Socorro || LINEAR || V || align=right | 1.2 km || 
|-id=091 bgcolor=#fefefe
| 203091 ||  || — || August 31, 2000 || Socorro || LINEAR || NYS || align=right | 1.2 km || 
|-id=092 bgcolor=#fefefe
| 203092 ||  || — || August 21, 2000 || Anderson Mesa || LONEOS || V || align=right | 1.2 km || 
|-id=093 bgcolor=#fefefe
| 203093 ||  || — || September 1, 2000 || Socorro || LINEAR || — || align=right | 1.6 km || 
|-id=094 bgcolor=#fefefe
| 203094 ||  || — || September 1, 2000 || Socorro || LINEAR || V || align=right | 1.2 km || 
|-id=095 bgcolor=#fefefe
| 203095 ||  || — || September 3, 2000 || Socorro || LINEAR || — || align=right | 2.1 km || 
|-id=096 bgcolor=#fefefe
| 203096 ||  || — || September 3, 2000 || Socorro || LINEAR || V || align=right | 1.3 km || 
|-id=097 bgcolor=#fefefe
| 203097 ||  || — || September 1, 2000 || Socorro || LINEAR || — || align=right | 1.7 km || 
|-id=098 bgcolor=#fefefe
| 203098 ||  || — || September 2, 2000 || Anderson Mesa || LONEOS || NYS || align=right | 2.2 km || 
|-id=099 bgcolor=#fefefe
| 203099 ||  || — || September 3, 2000 || Socorro || LINEAR || — || align=right | 1.6 km || 
|-id=100 bgcolor=#fefefe
| 203100 ||  || — || September 4, 2000 || Anderson Mesa || LONEOS || NYS || align=right data-sort-value="0.80" | 800 m || 
|}

203101–203200 

|-bgcolor=#fefefe
| 203101 ||  || — || September 4, 2000 || Anderson Mesa || LONEOS || NYS || align=right | 1.2 km || 
|-id=102 bgcolor=#fefefe
| 203102 ||  || — || September 5, 2000 || Anderson Mesa || LONEOS || CHL || align=right | 5.0 km || 
|-id=103 bgcolor=#fefefe
| 203103 ||  || — || September 23, 2000 || Socorro || LINEAR || — || align=right | 1.9 km || 
|-id=104 bgcolor=#fefefe
| 203104 ||  || — || September 25, 2000 || Socorro || LINEAR || H || align=right | 1.4 km || 
|-id=105 bgcolor=#fefefe
| 203105 ||  || — || September 24, 2000 || Socorro || LINEAR || MAS || align=right | 1.1 km || 
|-id=106 bgcolor=#fefefe
| 203106 ||  || — || September 24, 2000 || Socorro || LINEAR || — || align=right | 1.4 km || 
|-id=107 bgcolor=#fefefe
| 203107 ||  || — || September 24, 2000 || Socorro || LINEAR || — || align=right | 1.5 km || 
|-id=108 bgcolor=#fefefe
| 203108 ||  || — || September 24, 2000 || Socorro || LINEAR || NYS || align=right | 1.1 km || 
|-id=109 bgcolor=#fefefe
| 203109 ||  || — || September 24, 2000 || Socorro || LINEAR || NYS || align=right | 1.1 km || 
|-id=110 bgcolor=#fefefe
| 203110 ||  || — || September 23, 2000 || Socorro || LINEAR || — || align=right | 1.1 km || 
|-id=111 bgcolor=#E9E9E9
| 203111 ||  || — || September 24, 2000 || Socorro || LINEAR || EUN || align=right | 1.6 km || 
|-id=112 bgcolor=#fefefe
| 203112 ||  || — || September 23, 2000 || Socorro || LINEAR || V || align=right | 1.1 km || 
|-id=113 bgcolor=#fefefe
| 203113 ||  || — || September 19, 2000 || Haleakala || NEAT || — || align=right | 1.7 km || 
|-id=114 bgcolor=#fefefe
| 203114 ||  || — || September 24, 2000 || Socorro || LINEAR || — || align=right | 1.3 km || 
|-id=115 bgcolor=#fefefe
| 203115 ||  || — || September 24, 2000 || Socorro || LINEAR || — || align=right | 1.2 km || 
|-id=116 bgcolor=#fefefe
| 203116 ||  || — || September 24, 2000 || Socorro || LINEAR || NYS || align=right data-sort-value="0.92" | 920 m || 
|-id=117 bgcolor=#FA8072
| 203117 ||  || — || September 26, 2000 || Socorro || LINEAR || — || align=right | 1.4 km || 
|-id=118 bgcolor=#fefefe
| 203118 ||  || — || September 26, 2000 || Socorro || LINEAR || — || align=right | 1.9 km || 
|-id=119 bgcolor=#fefefe
| 203119 ||  || — || September 27, 2000 || Socorro || LINEAR || — || align=right | 1.7 km || 
|-id=120 bgcolor=#fefefe
| 203120 ||  || — || September 27, 2000 || Socorro || LINEAR || — || align=right | 1.5 km || 
|-id=121 bgcolor=#fefefe
| 203121 ||  || — || September 28, 2000 || Socorro || LINEAR || NYS || align=right | 1.1 km || 
|-id=122 bgcolor=#fefefe
| 203122 ||  || — || September 28, 2000 || Socorro || LINEAR || V || align=right | 1.2 km || 
|-id=123 bgcolor=#fefefe
| 203123 ||  || — || September 30, 2000 || Socorro || LINEAR || — || align=right | 1.4 km || 
|-id=124 bgcolor=#fefefe
| 203124 ||  || — || September 21, 2000 || Socorro || LINEAR || V || align=right | 1.1 km || 
|-id=125 bgcolor=#fefefe
| 203125 ||  || — || September 25, 2000 || Socorro || LINEAR || FLO || align=right | 1.2 km || 
|-id=126 bgcolor=#fefefe
| 203126 ||  || — || September 24, 2000 || Socorro || LINEAR || NYS || align=right | 1.1 km || 
|-id=127 bgcolor=#fefefe
| 203127 ||  || — || September 24, 2000 || Socorro || LINEAR || — || align=right | 1.3 km || 
|-id=128 bgcolor=#d6d6d6
| 203128 ||  || — || September 24, 2000 || Socorro || LINEAR || 3:2 || align=right | 7.7 km || 
|-id=129 bgcolor=#fefefe
| 203129 ||  || — || September 24, 2000 || Socorro || LINEAR || — || align=right | 1.8 km || 
|-id=130 bgcolor=#fefefe
| 203130 ||  || — || September 24, 2000 || Socorro || LINEAR || — || align=right | 1.2 km || 
|-id=131 bgcolor=#fefefe
| 203131 ||  || — || September 30, 2000 || Socorro || LINEAR || — || align=right | 2.2 km || 
|-id=132 bgcolor=#E9E9E9
| 203132 ||  || — || September 30, 2000 || Anderson Mesa || LONEOS || — || align=right | 1.5 km || 
|-id=133 bgcolor=#fefefe
| 203133 ||  || — || September 25, 2000 || Anderson Mesa || LONEOS || — || align=right | 1.5 km || 
|-id=134 bgcolor=#E9E9E9
| 203134 ||  || — || October 2, 2000 || OCA-Anza || M. Collins, R. Sipe || — || align=right | 1.5 km || 
|-id=135 bgcolor=#fefefe
| 203135 ||  || — || October 1, 2000 || Socorro || LINEAR || MAS || align=right | 1.1 km || 
|-id=136 bgcolor=#fefefe
| 203136 ||  || — || October 1, 2000 || Socorro || LINEAR || NYS || align=right data-sort-value="0.92" | 920 m || 
|-id=137 bgcolor=#fefefe
| 203137 ||  || — || October 1, 2000 || Socorro || LINEAR || MAS || align=right data-sort-value="0.78" | 780 m || 
|-id=138 bgcolor=#fefefe
| 203138 ||  || — || October 2, 2000 || Socorro || LINEAR || — || align=right | 3.2 km || 
|-id=139 bgcolor=#fefefe
| 203139 ||  || — || October 24, 2000 || Socorro || LINEAR || MAS || align=right | 1.1 km || 
|-id=140 bgcolor=#fefefe
| 203140 ||  || — || October 24, 2000 || Socorro || LINEAR || NYS || align=right | 1.1 km || 
|-id=141 bgcolor=#fefefe
| 203141 ||  || — || October 24, 2000 || Socorro || LINEAR || SUL || align=right | 3.3 km || 
|-id=142 bgcolor=#E9E9E9
| 203142 ||  || — || October 25, 2000 || Socorro || LINEAR || — || align=right | 1.5 km || 
|-id=143 bgcolor=#fefefe
| 203143 ||  || — || October 25, 2000 || Socorro || LINEAR || NYS || align=right | 1.3 km || 
|-id=144 bgcolor=#E9E9E9
| 203144 ||  || — || October 25, 2000 || Socorro || LINEAR || EUN || align=right | 1.5 km || 
|-id=145 bgcolor=#fefefe
| 203145 ||  || — || October 31, 2000 || Socorro || LINEAR || NYS || align=right data-sort-value="0.91" | 910 m || 
|-id=146 bgcolor=#fefefe
| 203146 ||  || — || November 1, 2000 || Socorro || LINEAR || MAS || align=right | 1.2 km || 
|-id=147 bgcolor=#fefefe
| 203147 ||  || — || November 1, 2000 || Socorro || LINEAR || NYS || align=right data-sort-value="0.88" | 880 m || 
|-id=148 bgcolor=#fefefe
| 203148 ||  || — || November 3, 2000 || Socorro || LINEAR || H || align=right data-sort-value="0.76" | 760 m || 
|-id=149 bgcolor=#fefefe
| 203149 ||  || — || November 2, 2000 || Socorro || LINEAR || NYS || align=right | 1.2 km || 
|-id=150 bgcolor=#E9E9E9
| 203150 ||  || — || November 22, 2000 || Kitt Peak || Spacewatch || ADE || align=right | 3.6 km || 
|-id=151 bgcolor=#E9E9E9
| 203151 ||  || — || November 22, 2000 || Kitt Peak || Spacewatch || EUN || align=right | 2.7 km || 
|-id=152 bgcolor=#E9E9E9
| 203152 ||  || — || November 20, 2000 || Socorro || LINEAR || — || align=right | 2.0 km || 
|-id=153 bgcolor=#fefefe
| 203153 ||  || — || November 21, 2000 || Socorro || LINEAR || — || align=right | 1.4 km || 
|-id=154 bgcolor=#fefefe
| 203154 ||  || — || November 20, 2000 || Socorro || LINEAR || — || align=right | 1.9 km || 
|-id=155 bgcolor=#E9E9E9
| 203155 ||  || — || November 26, 2000 || Socorro || LINEAR || — || align=right | 1.4 km || 
|-id=156 bgcolor=#d6d6d6
| 203156 ||  || — || November 21, 2000 || Socorro || LINEAR || SHU3:2 || align=right | 7.1 km || 
|-id=157 bgcolor=#d6d6d6
| 203157 ||  || — || November 21, 2000 || Socorro || LINEAR || SHU3:2 || align=right | 7.2 km || 
|-id=158 bgcolor=#fefefe
| 203158 ||  || — || November 20, 2000 || Anderson Mesa || LONEOS || — || align=right | 1.9 km || 
|-id=159 bgcolor=#d6d6d6
| 203159 ||  || — || November 21, 2000 || Socorro || LINEAR || SHU3:2 || align=right | 7.8 km || 
|-id=160 bgcolor=#E9E9E9
| 203160 ||  || — || November 28, 2000 || Kitt Peak || Spacewatch || — || align=right | 1.4 km || 
|-id=161 bgcolor=#fefefe
| 203161 ||  || — || November 24, 2000 || Anderson Mesa || LONEOS || — || align=right | 2.0 km || 
|-id=162 bgcolor=#E9E9E9
| 203162 ||  || — || November 27, 2000 || Socorro || LINEAR || — || align=right | 1.2 km || 
|-id=163 bgcolor=#fefefe
| 203163 ||  || — || December 1, 2000 || Socorro || LINEAR || — || align=right | 1.7 km || 
|-id=164 bgcolor=#E9E9E9
| 203164 ||  || — || December 1, 2000 || Socorro || LINEAR || EUN || align=right | 2.3 km || 
|-id=165 bgcolor=#fefefe
| 203165 ||  || — || December 4, 2000 || Socorro || LINEAR || — || align=right | 1.5 km || 
|-id=166 bgcolor=#fefefe
| 203166 ||  || — || December 5, 2000 || Socorro || LINEAR || H || align=right | 2.2 km || 
|-id=167 bgcolor=#E9E9E9
| 203167 ||  || — || December 7, 2000 || Socorro || LINEAR || BAR || align=right | 1.9 km || 
|-id=168 bgcolor=#fefefe
| 203168 ||  || — || December 7, 2000 || Socorro || LINEAR || H || align=right | 1.0 km || 
|-id=169 bgcolor=#E9E9E9
| 203169 ||  || — || December 23, 2000 || Socorro || LINEAR || — || align=right | 1.8 km || 
|-id=170 bgcolor=#fefefe
| 203170 ||  || — || December 30, 2000 || Socorro || LINEAR || — || align=right | 1.6 km || 
|-id=171 bgcolor=#E9E9E9
| 203171 ||  || — || December 30, 2000 || Socorro || LINEAR || — || align=right | 1.7 km || 
|-id=172 bgcolor=#fefefe
| 203172 ||  || — || December 30, 2000 || Socorro || LINEAR || — || align=right | 1.3 km || 
|-id=173 bgcolor=#E9E9E9
| 203173 ||  || — || December 30, 2000 || Socorro || LINEAR || fast? || align=right | 1.5 km || 
|-id=174 bgcolor=#E9E9E9
| 203174 ||  || — || December 30, 2000 || Socorro || LINEAR || GEF || align=right | 2.3 km || 
|-id=175 bgcolor=#E9E9E9
| 203175 ||  || — || December 30, 2000 || Socorro || LINEAR || KON || align=right | 4.2 km || 
|-id=176 bgcolor=#fefefe
| 203176 ||  || — || December 31, 2000 || Haleakala || NEAT || CIM || align=right | 4.8 km || 
|-id=177 bgcolor=#E9E9E9
| 203177 ||  || — || January 2, 2001 || Socorro || LINEAR || — || align=right | 2.1 km || 
|-id=178 bgcolor=#E9E9E9
| 203178 ||  || — || January 5, 2001 || Socorro || LINEAR || — || align=right | 2.5 km || 
|-id=179 bgcolor=#fefefe
| 203179 ||  || — || January 18, 2001 || Socorro || LINEAR || H || align=right data-sort-value="0.79" | 790 m || 
|-id=180 bgcolor=#E9E9E9
| 203180 ||  || — || January 19, 2001 || Kitt Peak || Spacewatch || — || align=right | 1.8 km || 
|-id=181 bgcolor=#fefefe
| 203181 ||  || — || January 20, 2001 || Socorro || LINEAR || FLO || align=right | 1.3 km || 
|-id=182 bgcolor=#E9E9E9
| 203182 ||  || — || January 20, 2001 || Socorro || LINEAR || — || align=right | 2.1 km || 
|-id=183 bgcolor=#E9E9E9
| 203183 ||  || — || January 20, 2001 || Socorro || LINEAR || — || align=right | 1.6 km || 
|-id=184 bgcolor=#E9E9E9
| 203184 ||  || — || January 19, 2001 || Kitt Peak || Spacewatch || — || align=right | 2.8 km || 
|-id=185 bgcolor=#E9E9E9
| 203185 ||  || — || January 26, 2001 || Socorro || LINEAR || MIT || align=right | 4.1 km || 
|-id=186 bgcolor=#FA8072
| 203186 ||  || — || January 31, 2001 || Socorro || LINEAR || H || align=right | 1.8 km || 
|-id=187 bgcolor=#fefefe
| 203187 || 2001 CK || — || February 1, 2001 || Socorro || LINEAR || H || align=right data-sort-value="0.81" | 810 m || 
|-id=188 bgcolor=#E9E9E9
| 203188 ||  || — || February 1, 2001 || Socorro || LINEAR || — || align=right | 1.8 km || 
|-id=189 bgcolor=#E9E9E9
| 203189 ||  || — || February 1, 2001 || Socorro || LINEAR || EUN || align=right | 2.2 km || 
|-id=190 bgcolor=#E9E9E9
| 203190 ||  || — || February 1, 2001 || Socorro || LINEAR || — || align=right | 1.7 km || 
|-id=191 bgcolor=#E9E9E9
| 203191 ||  || — || February 1, 2001 || Socorro || LINEAR || — || align=right | 1.3 km || 
|-id=192 bgcolor=#E9E9E9
| 203192 ||  || — || February 2, 2001 || Anderson Mesa || LONEOS || — || align=right | 1.9 km || 
|-id=193 bgcolor=#E9E9E9
| 203193 ||  || — || February 13, 2001 || Socorro || LINEAR || MAR || align=right | 2.2 km || 
|-id=194 bgcolor=#fefefe
| 203194 ||  || — || February 15, 2001 || Socorro || LINEAR || H || align=right data-sort-value="0.90" | 900 m || 
|-id=195 bgcolor=#E9E9E9
| 203195 ||  || — || February 14, 2001 || Bergisch Gladbach || W. Bickel || — || align=right | 1.6 km || 
|-id=196 bgcolor=#fefefe
| 203196 ||  || — || February 15, 2001 || Socorro || LINEAR || H || align=right | 1.3 km || 
|-id=197 bgcolor=#E9E9E9
| 203197 ||  || — || February 16, 2001 || Kitt Peak || Spacewatch || — || align=right | 1.5 km || 
|-id=198 bgcolor=#E9E9E9
| 203198 ||  || — || February 16, 2001 || Kitt Peak || Spacewatch || — || align=right | 1.4 km || 
|-id=199 bgcolor=#fefefe
| 203199 ||  || — || February 16, 2001 || Črni Vrh || Črni Vrh || H || align=right data-sort-value="0.84" | 840 m || 
|-id=200 bgcolor=#E9E9E9
| 203200 ||  || — || February 16, 2001 || Socorro || LINEAR || — || align=right | 1.5 km || 
|}

203201–203300 

|-bgcolor=#E9E9E9
| 203201 ||  || — || February 17, 2001 || Socorro || LINEAR || — || align=right | 1.5 km || 
|-id=202 bgcolor=#E9E9E9
| 203202 ||  || — || February 19, 2001 || Socorro || LINEAR || EUN || align=right | 2.0 km || 
|-id=203 bgcolor=#E9E9E9
| 203203 ||  || — || February 19, 2001 || Socorro || LINEAR || — || align=right | 1.7 km || 
|-id=204 bgcolor=#E9E9E9
| 203204 ||  || — || February 16, 2001 || Socorro || LINEAR || — || align=right | 2.3 km || 
|-id=205 bgcolor=#E9E9E9
| 203205 ||  || — || February 19, 2001 || Socorro || LINEAR || — || align=right | 2.7 km || 
|-id=206 bgcolor=#E9E9E9
| 203206 ||  || — || February 19, 2001 || Socorro || LINEAR || — || align=right | 2.4 km || 
|-id=207 bgcolor=#E9E9E9
| 203207 ||  || — || February 19, 2001 || Socorro || LINEAR || — || align=right | 2.2 km || 
|-id=208 bgcolor=#E9E9E9
| 203208 ||  || — || February 20, 2001 || Socorro || LINEAR || — || align=right | 1.5 km || 
|-id=209 bgcolor=#E9E9E9
| 203209 ||  || — || February 17, 2001 || Haleakala || NEAT || — || align=right | 2.6 km || 
|-id=210 bgcolor=#C2FFFF
| 203210 ||  || — || February 16, 2001 || Socorro || LINEAR || L4 || align=right | 15 km || 
|-id=211 bgcolor=#E9E9E9
| 203211 ||  || — || February 21, 2001 || Apache Point || SDSS || — || align=right | 2.7 km || 
|-id=212 bgcolor=#E9E9E9
| 203212 ||  || — || March 2, 2001 || Anderson Mesa || LONEOS || — || align=right | 1.8 km || 
|-id=213 bgcolor=#E9E9E9
| 203213 ||  || — || March 2, 2001 || Haleakala || NEAT || — || align=right | 4.5 km || 
|-id=214 bgcolor=#E9E9E9
| 203214 ||  || — || March 13, 2001 || Socorro || LINEAR || PAL || align=right | 4.0 km || 
|-id=215 bgcolor=#E9E9E9
| 203215 ||  || — || March 15, 2001 || Socorro || LINEAR || EUN || align=right | 2.9 km || 
|-id=216 bgcolor=#E9E9E9
| 203216 ||  || — || March 16, 2001 || Socorro || LINEAR || — || align=right | 2.6 km || 
|-id=217 bgcolor=#FFC2E0
| 203217 ||  || — || March 21, 2001 || Kvistaberg || UDAS || AMO || align=right data-sort-value="0.66" | 660 m || 
|-id=218 bgcolor=#E9E9E9
| 203218 ||  || — || March 19, 2001 || Socorro || LINEAR || — || align=right | 1.5 km || 
|-id=219 bgcolor=#E9E9E9
| 203219 ||  || — || March 19, 2001 || Socorro || LINEAR || — || align=right | 1.5 km || 
|-id=220 bgcolor=#E9E9E9
| 203220 ||  || — || March 19, 2001 || Socorro || LINEAR || — || align=right | 2.2 km || 
|-id=221 bgcolor=#E9E9E9
| 203221 ||  || — || March 19, 2001 || Socorro || LINEAR || — || align=right | 2.7 km || 
|-id=222 bgcolor=#E9E9E9
| 203222 ||  || — || March 23, 2001 || Socorro || LINEAR || — || align=right | 3.8 km || 
|-id=223 bgcolor=#E9E9E9
| 203223 ||  || — || March 23, 2001 || Socorro || LINEAR || — || align=right | 2.9 km || 
|-id=224 bgcolor=#E9E9E9
| 203224 ||  || — || March 16, 2001 || Socorro || LINEAR || — || align=right | 1.7 km || 
|-id=225 bgcolor=#E9E9E9
| 203225 ||  || — || March 16, 2001 || Socorro || LINEAR || — || align=right | 4.2 km || 
|-id=226 bgcolor=#E9E9E9
| 203226 ||  || — || March 16, 2001 || Socorro || LINEAR || — || align=right | 2.2 km || 
|-id=227 bgcolor=#E9E9E9
| 203227 ||  || — || March 23, 2001 || Anderson Mesa || LONEOS || — || align=right | 1.3 km || 
|-id=228 bgcolor=#E9E9E9
| 203228 ||  || — || March 20, 2001 || Haleakala || NEAT || — || align=right | 2.2 km || 
|-id=229 bgcolor=#E9E9E9
| 203229 ||  || — || March 24, 2001 || Haleakala || NEAT || EUN || align=right | 2.1 km || 
|-id=230 bgcolor=#E9E9E9
| 203230 ||  || — || March 19, 2001 || Socorro || LINEAR || — || align=right | 3.1 km || 
|-id=231 bgcolor=#E9E9E9
| 203231 ||  || — || March 25, 2001 || Anderson Mesa || LONEOS || — || align=right | 3.4 km || 
|-id=232 bgcolor=#E9E9E9
| 203232 ||  || — || April 15, 2001 || Anderson Mesa || LONEOS || BAR || align=right | 2.4 km || 
|-id=233 bgcolor=#fefefe
| 203233 ||  || — || April 16, 2001 || Socorro || LINEAR || — || align=right | 1.3 km || 
|-id=234 bgcolor=#E9E9E9
| 203234 ||  || — || April 22, 2001 || Haleakala || NEAT || — || align=right | 3.0 km || 
|-id=235 bgcolor=#E9E9E9
| 203235 ||  || — || April 24, 2001 || Anderson Mesa || LONEOS || — || align=right | 2.2 km || 
|-id=236 bgcolor=#E9E9E9
| 203236 ||  || — || April 24, 2001 || Anderson Mesa || LONEOS || — || align=right | 5.2 km || 
|-id=237 bgcolor=#E9E9E9
| 203237 ||  || — || May 15, 2001 || Haleakala || NEAT || — || align=right | 3.6 km || 
|-id=238 bgcolor=#E9E9E9
| 203238 ||  || — || May 23, 2001 || Socorro || LINEAR || JUN || align=right | 4.2 km || 
|-id=239 bgcolor=#d6d6d6
| 203239 ||  || — || June 21, 2001 || Palomar || NEAT || HYG || align=right | 6.3 km || 
|-id=240 bgcolor=#fefefe
| 203240 ||  || — || July 14, 2001 || Palomar || NEAT || — || align=right data-sort-value="0.99" | 990 m || 
|-id=241 bgcolor=#E9E9E9
| 203241 ||  || — || July 17, 2001 || Palomar || NEAT || GAL || align=right | 2.5 km || 
|-id=242 bgcolor=#d6d6d6
| 203242 ||  || — || July 24, 2001 || Prescott || P. G. Comba || — || align=right | 3.8 km || 
|-id=243 bgcolor=#d6d6d6
| 203243 ||  || — || July 27, 2001 || Palomar || NEAT || HYG || align=right | 5.5 km || 
|-id=244 bgcolor=#fefefe
| 203244 ||  || — || July 27, 2001 || Anderson Mesa || LONEOS || FLO || align=right data-sort-value="0.87" | 870 m || 
|-id=245 bgcolor=#d6d6d6
| 203245 ||  || — || July 29, 2001 || Socorro || LINEAR || LIX || align=right | 8.8 km || 
|-id=246 bgcolor=#fefefe
| 203246 ||  || — || July 27, 2001 || Haleakala || NEAT || — || align=right data-sort-value="0.97" | 970 m || 
|-id=247 bgcolor=#d6d6d6
| 203247 ||  || — || August 16, 2001 || Socorro || LINEAR || TIR || align=right | 4.8 km || 
|-id=248 bgcolor=#fefefe
| 203248 ||  || — || August 16, 2001 || Socorro || LINEAR || — || align=right | 1.9 km || 
|-id=249 bgcolor=#E9E9E9
| 203249 ||  || — || August 16, 2001 || Socorro || LINEAR || — || align=right | 3.2 km || 
|-id=250 bgcolor=#fefefe
| 203250 ||  || — || August 22, 2001 || Desert Eagle || W. K. Y. Yeung || — || align=right | 1.2 km || 
|-id=251 bgcolor=#fefefe
| 203251 ||  || — || August 16, 2001 || Socorro || LINEAR || — || align=right | 1.5 km || 
|-id=252 bgcolor=#fefefe
| 203252 ||  || — || August 16, 2001 || Socorro || LINEAR || — || align=right data-sort-value="0.97" | 970 m || 
|-id=253 bgcolor=#fefefe
| 203253 ||  || — || August 17, 2001 || Socorro || LINEAR || FLO || align=right data-sort-value="0.93" | 930 m || 
|-id=254 bgcolor=#d6d6d6
| 203254 ||  || — || August 20, 2001 || Socorro || LINEAR || — || align=right | 6.5 km || 
|-id=255 bgcolor=#fefefe
| 203255 ||  || — || August 22, 2001 || Socorro || LINEAR || FLO || align=right | 1.0 km || 
|-id=256 bgcolor=#d6d6d6
| 203256 ||  || — || August 25, 2001 || Haleakala || NEAT || — || align=right | 5.3 km || 
|-id=257 bgcolor=#fefefe
| 203257 ||  || — || August 27, 2001 || Ondřejov || P. Kušnirák || — || align=right data-sort-value="0.85" | 850 m || 
|-id=258 bgcolor=#fefefe
| 203258 ||  || — || August 23, 2001 || Anderson Mesa || LONEOS || — || align=right data-sort-value="0.80" | 800 m || 
|-id=259 bgcolor=#d6d6d6
| 203259 ||  || — || August 24, 2001 || Haleakala || NEAT || — || align=right | 3.9 km || 
|-id=260 bgcolor=#fefefe
| 203260 ||  || — || August 21, 2001 || Kitt Peak || Spacewatch || — || align=right data-sort-value="0.78" | 780 m || 
|-id=261 bgcolor=#d6d6d6
| 203261 ||  || — || August 21, 2001 || Palomar || NEAT || 7:4 || align=right | 8.1 km || 
|-id=262 bgcolor=#d6d6d6
| 203262 ||  || — || August 24, 2001 || Socorro || LINEAR || — || align=right | 3.4 km || 
|-id=263 bgcolor=#d6d6d6
| 203263 ||  || — || August 24, 2001 || Socorro || LINEAR || ALA || align=right | 5.6 km || 
|-id=264 bgcolor=#d6d6d6
| 203264 ||  || — || August 24, 2001 || Goodricke-Pigott || R. A. Tucker || TIR || align=right | 6.8 km || 
|-id=265 bgcolor=#fefefe
| 203265 ||  || — || August 25, 2001 || Socorro || LINEAR || FLO || align=right | 1.8 km || 
|-id=266 bgcolor=#d6d6d6
| 203266 ||  || — || August 20, 2001 || Socorro || LINEAR || HYG || align=right | 4.5 km || 
|-id=267 bgcolor=#d6d6d6
| 203267 ||  || — || August 19, 2001 || Socorro || LINEAR || — || align=right | 3.1 km || 
|-id=268 bgcolor=#fefefe
| 203268 ||  || — || August 19, 2001 || Socorro || LINEAR || — || align=right data-sort-value="0.94" | 940 m || 
|-id=269 bgcolor=#FA8072
| 203269 ||  || — || August 19, 2001 || Socorro || LINEAR || — || align=right | 1.1 km || 
|-id=270 bgcolor=#d6d6d6
| 203270 ||  || — || August 23, 2001 || Haleakala || NEAT || HYG || align=right | 5.2 km || 
|-id=271 bgcolor=#d6d6d6
| 203271 ||  || — || September 9, 2001 || Desert Eagle || W. K. Y. Yeung || — || align=right | 5.3 km || 
|-id=272 bgcolor=#FA8072
| 203272 ||  || — || September 10, 2001 || Desert Eagle || W. K. Y. Yeung || — || align=right | 1.1 km || 
|-id=273 bgcolor=#d6d6d6
| 203273 ||  || — || September 10, 2001 || Socorro || LINEAR || ALA || align=right | 4.5 km || 
|-id=274 bgcolor=#fefefe
| 203274 ||  || — || September 7, 2001 || Socorro || LINEAR || — || align=right data-sort-value="0.70" | 700 m || 
|-id=275 bgcolor=#d6d6d6
| 203275 ||  || — || September 8, 2001 || Socorro || LINEAR || — || align=right | 5.2 km || 
|-id=276 bgcolor=#fefefe
| 203276 ||  || — || September 10, 2001 || Socorro || LINEAR || — || align=right | 1.3 km || 
|-id=277 bgcolor=#d6d6d6
| 203277 ||  || — || September 12, 2001 || Socorro || LINEAR || — || align=right | 4.1 km || 
|-id=278 bgcolor=#fefefe
| 203278 ||  || — || September 10, 2001 || Socorro || LINEAR || FLO || align=right data-sort-value="0.89" | 890 m || 
|-id=279 bgcolor=#fefefe
| 203279 ||  || — || September 10, 2001 || Socorro || LINEAR || FLO || align=right | 1.0 km || 
|-id=280 bgcolor=#fefefe
| 203280 ||  || — || September 11, 2001 || Anderson Mesa || LONEOS || — || align=right | 1.0 km || 
|-id=281 bgcolor=#d6d6d6
| 203281 ||  || — || September 12, 2001 || Socorro || LINEAR || — || align=right | 3.4 km || 
|-id=282 bgcolor=#d6d6d6
| 203282 ||  || — || September 12, 2001 || Socorro || LINEAR || — || align=right | 3.4 km || 
|-id=283 bgcolor=#d6d6d6
| 203283 ||  || — || September 8, 2001 || Socorro || LINEAR || — || align=right | 3.5 km || 
|-id=284 bgcolor=#d6d6d6
| 203284 ||  || — || September 9, 2001 || Anderson Mesa || LONEOS || ALA || align=right | 9.1 km || 
|-id=285 bgcolor=#fefefe
| 203285 ||  || — || September 11, 2001 || Anderson Mesa || LONEOS || — || align=right | 1.0 km || 
|-id=286 bgcolor=#fefefe
| 203286 ||  || — || September 17, 2001 || Desert Eagle || W. K. Y. Yeung || — || align=right | 1.1 km || 
|-id=287 bgcolor=#fefefe
| 203287 ||  || — || September 16, 2001 || Socorro || LINEAR || — || align=right data-sort-value="0.76" | 760 m || 
|-id=288 bgcolor=#fefefe
| 203288 ||  || — || September 16, 2001 || Socorro || LINEAR || — || align=right | 1.3 km || 
|-id=289 bgcolor=#fefefe
| 203289 ||  || — || September 16, 2001 || Socorro || LINEAR || — || align=right | 1.1 km || 
|-id=290 bgcolor=#fefefe
| 203290 ||  || — || September 17, 2001 || Socorro || LINEAR || — || align=right data-sort-value="0.92" | 920 m || 
|-id=291 bgcolor=#fefefe
| 203291 ||  || — || September 17, 2001 || Socorro || LINEAR || — || align=right | 4.1 km || 
|-id=292 bgcolor=#fefefe
| 203292 ||  || — || September 19, 2001 || Anderson Mesa || LONEOS || FLO || align=right data-sort-value="0.91" | 910 m || 
|-id=293 bgcolor=#d6d6d6
| 203293 ||  || — || September 16, 2001 || Socorro || LINEAR || — || align=right | 4.0 km || 
|-id=294 bgcolor=#d6d6d6
| 203294 ||  || — || September 20, 2001 || Socorro || LINEAR || HYG || align=right | 3.8 km || 
|-id=295 bgcolor=#fefefe
| 203295 ||  || — || September 20, 2001 || Socorro || LINEAR || — || align=right data-sort-value="0.91" | 910 m || 
|-id=296 bgcolor=#d6d6d6
| 203296 ||  || — || September 16, 2001 || Socorro || LINEAR || HYG || align=right | 4.4 km || 
|-id=297 bgcolor=#d6d6d6
| 203297 ||  || — || September 16, 2001 || Socorro || LINEAR || — || align=right | 4.7 km || 
|-id=298 bgcolor=#fefefe
| 203298 ||  || — || September 17, 2001 || Socorro || LINEAR || FLO || align=right data-sort-value="0.97" | 970 m || 
|-id=299 bgcolor=#fefefe
| 203299 ||  || — || September 17, 2001 || Socorro || LINEAR || — || align=right | 1.2 km || 
|-id=300 bgcolor=#fefefe
| 203300 ||  || — || September 19, 2001 || Socorro || LINEAR || FLO || align=right | 1.0 km || 
|}

203301–203400 

|-bgcolor=#fefefe
| 203301 ||  || — || September 19, 2001 || Socorro || LINEAR || FLO || align=right data-sort-value="0.80" | 800 m || 
|-id=302 bgcolor=#fefefe
| 203302 ||  || — || September 19, 2001 || Socorro || LINEAR || — || align=right | 1.1 km || 
|-id=303 bgcolor=#fefefe
| 203303 ||  || — || September 19, 2001 || Socorro || LINEAR || — || align=right data-sort-value="0.85" | 850 m || 
|-id=304 bgcolor=#fefefe
| 203304 ||  || — || September 25, 2001 || Desert Eagle || W. K. Y. Yeung || — || align=right | 1.2 km || 
|-id=305 bgcolor=#d6d6d6
| 203305 ||  || — || September 18, 2001 || Kitt Peak || Spacewatch || — || align=right | 4.2 km || 
|-id=306 bgcolor=#fefefe
| 203306 ||  || — || September 17, 2001 || Anderson Mesa || LONEOS || — || align=right | 1.3 km || 
|-id=307 bgcolor=#fefefe
| 203307 ||  || — || September 21, 2001 || Socorro || LINEAR || — || align=right data-sort-value="0.92" | 920 m || 
|-id=308 bgcolor=#d6d6d6
| 203308 ||  || — || September 25, 2001 || Socorro || LINEAR || — || align=right | 3.5 km || 
|-id=309 bgcolor=#d6d6d6
| 203309 ||  || — || September 17, 2001 || Kitt Peak || Spacewatch || — || align=right | 4.2 km || 
|-id=310 bgcolor=#fefefe
| 203310 ||  || — || October 14, 2001 || Socorro || LINEAR || — || align=right data-sort-value="0.89" | 890 m || 
|-id=311 bgcolor=#fefefe
| 203311 ||  || — || October 14, 2001 || Socorro || LINEAR || FLO || align=right | 1.1 km || 
|-id=312 bgcolor=#fefefe
| 203312 ||  || — || October 14, 2001 || Socorro || LINEAR || — || align=right | 1.5 km || 
|-id=313 bgcolor=#fefefe
| 203313 ||  || — || October 13, 2001 || Socorro || LINEAR || FLO || align=right | 1.0 km || 
|-id=314 bgcolor=#fefefe
| 203314 ||  || — || October 13, 2001 || Socorro || LINEAR || — || align=right data-sort-value="0.87" | 870 m || 
|-id=315 bgcolor=#fefefe
| 203315 ||  || — || October 13, 2001 || Socorro || LINEAR || — || align=right | 1.0 km || 
|-id=316 bgcolor=#fefefe
| 203316 ||  || — || October 13, 2001 || Socorro || LINEAR || — || align=right | 1.2 km || 
|-id=317 bgcolor=#fefefe
| 203317 ||  || — || October 13, 2001 || Socorro || LINEAR || — || align=right | 1.2 km || 
|-id=318 bgcolor=#fefefe
| 203318 ||  || — || October 13, 2001 || Socorro || LINEAR || — || align=right | 1.00 km || 
|-id=319 bgcolor=#fefefe
| 203319 ||  || — || October 13, 2001 || Socorro || LINEAR || FLO || align=right | 1.7 km || 
|-id=320 bgcolor=#fefefe
| 203320 ||  || — || October 14, 2001 || Socorro || LINEAR || — || align=right | 1.2 km || 
|-id=321 bgcolor=#fefefe
| 203321 ||  || — || October 14, 2001 || Socorro || LINEAR || — || align=right | 1.0 km || 
|-id=322 bgcolor=#fefefe
| 203322 ||  || — || October 14, 2001 || Socorro || LINEAR || — || align=right | 1.2 km || 
|-id=323 bgcolor=#fefefe
| 203323 ||  || — || October 14, 2001 || Socorro || LINEAR || FLO || align=right | 1.2 km || 
|-id=324 bgcolor=#fefefe
| 203324 ||  || — || October 14, 2001 || Socorro || LINEAR || — || align=right | 1.1 km || 
|-id=325 bgcolor=#fefefe
| 203325 ||  || — || October 10, 2001 || Palomar || NEAT || — || align=right | 1.0 km || 
|-id=326 bgcolor=#fefefe
| 203326 ||  || — || October 10, 2001 || Palomar || NEAT || — || align=right | 1.1 km || 
|-id=327 bgcolor=#fefefe
| 203327 ||  || — || October 14, 2001 || Socorro || LINEAR || — || align=right data-sort-value="0.99" | 990 m || 
|-id=328 bgcolor=#fefefe
| 203328 ||  || — || October 14, 2001 || Socorro || LINEAR || — || align=right | 1.1 km || 
|-id=329 bgcolor=#fefefe
| 203329 ||  || — || October 14, 2001 || Socorro || LINEAR || NYS || align=right | 2.2 km || 
|-id=330 bgcolor=#fefefe
| 203330 ||  || — || October 14, 2001 || Socorro || LINEAR || FLO || align=right | 1.3 km || 
|-id=331 bgcolor=#fefefe
| 203331 ||  || — || October 11, 2001 || Socorro || LINEAR || — || align=right | 1.1 km || 
|-id=332 bgcolor=#fefefe
| 203332 ||  || — || October 11, 2001 || Kitt Peak || Spacewatch || — || align=right | 1.2 km || 
|-id=333 bgcolor=#d6d6d6
| 203333 ||  || — || October 13, 2001 || Palomar || NEAT || LIX || align=right | 6.0 km || 
|-id=334 bgcolor=#d6d6d6
| 203334 ||  || — || October 14, 2001 || Palomar || NEAT || — || align=right | 7.1 km || 
|-id=335 bgcolor=#d6d6d6
| 203335 ||  || — || October 15, 2001 || Socorro || LINEAR || — || align=right | 5.1 km || 
|-id=336 bgcolor=#fefefe
| 203336 ||  || — || October 21, 2001 || Palomar || NEAT || — || align=right data-sort-value="0.94" | 940 m || 
|-id=337 bgcolor=#fefefe
| 203337 ||  || — || October 25, 2001 || Desert Eagle || W. K. Y. Yeung || — || align=right | 1.3 km || 
|-id=338 bgcolor=#fefefe
| 203338 ||  || — || October 17, 2001 || Socorro || LINEAR || — || align=right data-sort-value="0.95" | 950 m || 
|-id=339 bgcolor=#d6d6d6
| 203339 ||  || — || October 17, 2001 || Socorro || LINEAR || 7:4 || align=right | 6.4 km || 
|-id=340 bgcolor=#fefefe
| 203340 ||  || — || October 19, 2001 || Socorro || LINEAR || FLO || align=right | 1.1 km || 
|-id=341 bgcolor=#fefefe
| 203341 ||  || — || October 17, 2001 || Socorro || LINEAR || — || align=right | 1.4 km || 
|-id=342 bgcolor=#fefefe
| 203342 ||  || — || October 20, 2001 || Socorro || LINEAR || NYS || align=right data-sort-value="0.83" | 830 m || 
|-id=343 bgcolor=#fefefe
| 203343 ||  || — || October 20, 2001 || Socorro || LINEAR || — || align=right | 1.4 km || 
|-id=344 bgcolor=#fefefe
| 203344 ||  || — || October 20, 2001 || Socorro || LINEAR || — || align=right data-sort-value="0.85" | 850 m || 
|-id=345 bgcolor=#fefefe
| 203345 ||  || — || October 20, 2001 || Socorro || LINEAR || FLO || align=right data-sort-value="0.93" | 930 m || 
|-id=346 bgcolor=#fefefe
| 203346 ||  || — || October 22, 2001 || Socorro || LINEAR || NYS || align=right data-sort-value="0.97" | 970 m || 
|-id=347 bgcolor=#fefefe
| 203347 ||  || — || October 23, 2001 || Socorro || LINEAR || — || align=right | 1.1 km || 
|-id=348 bgcolor=#d6d6d6
| 203348 ||  || — || October 23, 2001 || Socorro || LINEAR || — || align=right | 5.8 km || 
|-id=349 bgcolor=#fefefe
| 203349 ||  || — || October 19, 2001 || Palomar || NEAT || — || align=right | 1.7 km || 
|-id=350 bgcolor=#fefefe
| 203350 ||  || — || October 19, 2001 || Palomar || NEAT || — || align=right | 1.1 km || 
|-id=351 bgcolor=#fefefe
| 203351 ||  || — || November 9, 2001 || Socorro || LINEAR || — || align=right | 2.9 km || 
|-id=352 bgcolor=#fefefe
| 203352 ||  || — || November 10, 2001 || Socorro || LINEAR || FLO || align=right | 1.1 km || 
|-id=353 bgcolor=#fefefe
| 203353 ||  || — || November 10, 2001 || Socorro || LINEAR || — || align=right | 1.4 km || 
|-id=354 bgcolor=#fefefe
| 203354 ||  || — || November 10, 2001 || Socorro || LINEAR || — || align=right | 1.1 km || 
|-id=355 bgcolor=#fefefe
| 203355 ||  || — || November 10, 2001 || Socorro || LINEAR || — || align=right | 1.0 km || 
|-id=356 bgcolor=#fefefe
| 203356 ||  || — || November 10, 2001 || Socorro || LINEAR || V || align=right data-sort-value="0.97" | 970 m || 
|-id=357 bgcolor=#fefefe
| 203357 ||  || — || November 10, 2001 || Socorro || LINEAR || — || align=right | 1.3 km || 
|-id=358 bgcolor=#fefefe
| 203358 ||  || — || November 10, 2001 || Socorro || LINEAR || V || align=right data-sort-value="0.99" | 990 m || 
|-id=359 bgcolor=#fefefe
| 203359 ||  || — || November 15, 2001 || Palomar || NEAT || NYS || align=right data-sort-value="0.95" | 950 m || 
|-id=360 bgcolor=#fefefe
| 203360 ||  || — || November 12, 2001 || Socorro || LINEAR || — || align=right data-sort-value="0.94" | 940 m || 
|-id=361 bgcolor=#fefefe
| 203361 ||  || — || November 12, 2001 || Socorro || LINEAR || — || align=right data-sort-value="0.84" | 840 m || 
|-id=362 bgcolor=#fefefe
| 203362 ||  || — || November 12, 2001 || Socorro || LINEAR || — || align=right | 1.6 km || 
|-id=363 bgcolor=#fefefe
| 203363 ||  || — || November 12, 2001 || Socorro || LINEAR || FLO || align=right data-sort-value="0.96" | 960 m || 
|-id=364 bgcolor=#fefefe
| 203364 ||  || — || November 9, 2001 || Socorro || LINEAR || FLO || align=right data-sort-value="0.79" | 790 m || 
|-id=365 bgcolor=#fefefe
| 203365 ||  || — || November 11, 2001 || Socorro || LINEAR || FLO || align=right | 1.1 km || 
|-id=366 bgcolor=#fefefe
| 203366 ||  || — || November 11, 2001 || Socorro || LINEAR || — || align=right | 1.4 km || 
|-id=367 bgcolor=#fefefe
| 203367 ||  || — || November 19, 2001 || Oizumi || T. Kobayashi || — || align=right | 1.1 km || 
|-id=368 bgcolor=#fefefe
| 203368 ||  || — || November 17, 2001 || Kitt Peak || Spacewatch || — || align=right | 1.0 km || 
|-id=369 bgcolor=#fefefe
| 203369 ||  || — || November 17, 2001 || Socorro || LINEAR || — || align=right | 1.1 km || 
|-id=370 bgcolor=#fefefe
| 203370 ||  || — || November 17, 2001 || Socorro || LINEAR || DAT || align=right | 1.0 km || 
|-id=371 bgcolor=#fefefe
| 203371 ||  || — || November 18, 2001 || Socorro || LINEAR || — || align=right | 2.8 km || 
|-id=372 bgcolor=#fefefe
| 203372 ||  || — || November 20, 2001 || Socorro || LINEAR || V || align=right data-sort-value="0.95" | 950 m || 
|-id=373 bgcolor=#fefefe
| 203373 ||  || — || November 17, 2001 || Kitt Peak || Spacewatch || — || align=right data-sort-value="0.76" | 760 m || 
|-id=374 bgcolor=#fefefe
| 203374 ||  || — || December 7, 2001 || Socorro || LINEAR || — || align=right | 1.0 km || 
|-id=375 bgcolor=#fefefe
| 203375 ||  || — || December 9, 2001 || Socorro || LINEAR || — || align=right | 1.4 km || 
|-id=376 bgcolor=#fefefe
| 203376 ||  || — || December 9, 2001 || Socorro || LINEAR || ERI || align=right | 2.0 km || 
|-id=377 bgcolor=#fefefe
| 203377 ||  || — || December 9, 2001 || Socorro || LINEAR || V || align=right | 1.1 km || 
|-id=378 bgcolor=#fefefe
| 203378 ||  || — || December 9, 2001 || Socorro || LINEAR || — || align=right | 1.5 km || 
|-id=379 bgcolor=#fefefe
| 203379 ||  || — || December 10, 2001 || Socorro || LINEAR || — || align=right | 1.4 km || 
|-id=380 bgcolor=#fefefe
| 203380 ||  || — || December 10, 2001 || Socorro || LINEAR || — || align=right | 1.2 km || 
|-id=381 bgcolor=#fefefe
| 203381 ||  || — || December 11, 2001 || Socorro || LINEAR || — || align=right | 1.3 km || 
|-id=382 bgcolor=#fefefe
| 203382 ||  || — || December 11, 2001 || Socorro || LINEAR || FLO || align=right data-sort-value="0.96" | 960 m || 
|-id=383 bgcolor=#fefefe
| 203383 ||  || — || December 10, 2001 || Socorro || LINEAR || — || align=right | 1.3 km || 
|-id=384 bgcolor=#fefefe
| 203384 ||  || — || December 10, 2001 || Socorro || LINEAR || — || align=right | 1.1 km || 
|-id=385 bgcolor=#fefefe
| 203385 ||  || — || December 10, 2001 || Socorro || LINEAR || — || align=right | 1.2 km || 
|-id=386 bgcolor=#fefefe
| 203386 ||  || — || December 10, 2001 || Socorro || LINEAR || — || align=right | 1.4 km || 
|-id=387 bgcolor=#FA8072
| 203387 ||  || — || December 14, 2001 || Socorro || LINEAR || — || align=right | 1.5 km || 
|-id=388 bgcolor=#fefefe
| 203388 ||  || — || December 14, 2001 || Kitt Peak || Spacewatch || — || align=right | 1.1 km || 
|-id=389 bgcolor=#fefefe
| 203389 ||  || — || December 14, 2001 || Socorro || LINEAR || — || align=right data-sort-value="0.98" | 980 m || 
|-id=390 bgcolor=#fefefe
| 203390 ||  || — || December 14, 2001 || Socorro || LINEAR || — || align=right | 2.0 km || 
|-id=391 bgcolor=#fefefe
| 203391 ||  || — || December 14, 2001 || Socorro || LINEAR || FLO || align=right data-sort-value="0.89" | 890 m || 
|-id=392 bgcolor=#fefefe
| 203392 ||  || — || December 14, 2001 || Socorro || LINEAR || — || align=right data-sort-value="0.91" | 910 m || 
|-id=393 bgcolor=#fefefe
| 203393 ||  || — || December 14, 2001 || Socorro || LINEAR || — || align=right | 1.2 km || 
|-id=394 bgcolor=#d6d6d6
| 203394 ||  || — || December 14, 2001 || Socorro || LINEAR || 7:4 || align=right | 4.6 km || 
|-id=395 bgcolor=#fefefe
| 203395 ||  || — || December 14, 2001 || Socorro || LINEAR || — || align=right | 1.2 km || 
|-id=396 bgcolor=#fefefe
| 203396 ||  || — || December 14, 2001 || Socorro || LINEAR || — || align=right | 1.1 km || 
|-id=397 bgcolor=#fefefe
| 203397 ||  || — || December 14, 2001 || Socorro || LINEAR || NYS || align=right | 1.0 km || 
|-id=398 bgcolor=#fefefe
| 203398 ||  || — || December 14, 2001 || Socorro || LINEAR || — || align=right | 1.5 km || 
|-id=399 bgcolor=#fefefe
| 203399 ||  || — || December 14, 2001 || Socorro || LINEAR || — || align=right | 1.4 km || 
|-id=400 bgcolor=#fefefe
| 203400 ||  || — || December 14, 2001 || Socorro || LINEAR || NYS || align=right | 2.3 km || 
|}

203401–203500 

|-bgcolor=#fefefe
| 203401 ||  || — || December 14, 2001 || Socorro || LINEAR || — || align=right | 1.3 km || 
|-id=402 bgcolor=#fefefe
| 203402 ||  || — || December 14, 2001 || Socorro || LINEAR || — || align=right | 1.3 km || 
|-id=403 bgcolor=#fefefe
| 203403 ||  || — || December 14, 2001 || Socorro || LINEAR || — || align=right | 1.4 km || 
|-id=404 bgcolor=#fefefe
| 203404 ||  || — || December 14, 2001 || Socorro || LINEAR || — || align=right | 1.1 km || 
|-id=405 bgcolor=#fefefe
| 203405 ||  || — || December 14, 2001 || Socorro || LINEAR || — || align=right | 1.0 km || 
|-id=406 bgcolor=#fefefe
| 203406 ||  || — || December 14, 2001 || Socorro || LINEAR || — || align=right | 1.3 km || 
|-id=407 bgcolor=#fefefe
| 203407 ||  || — || December 14, 2001 || Socorro || LINEAR || FLO || align=right | 1.1 km || 
|-id=408 bgcolor=#fefefe
| 203408 ||  || — || December 14, 2001 || Socorro || LINEAR || — || align=right | 1.2 km || 
|-id=409 bgcolor=#fefefe
| 203409 ||  || — || December 14, 2001 || Socorro || LINEAR || NYS || align=right data-sort-value="0.90" | 900 m || 
|-id=410 bgcolor=#fefefe
| 203410 ||  || — || December 14, 2001 || Socorro || LINEAR || NYS || align=right | 1.0 km || 
|-id=411 bgcolor=#fefefe
| 203411 ||  || — || December 14, 2001 || Socorro || LINEAR || V || align=right data-sort-value="0.91" | 910 m || 
|-id=412 bgcolor=#fefefe
| 203412 ||  || — || December 14, 2001 || Socorro || LINEAR || — || align=right | 1.4 km || 
|-id=413 bgcolor=#fefefe
| 203413 ||  || — || December 14, 2001 || Socorro || LINEAR || — || align=right | 1.3 km || 
|-id=414 bgcolor=#fefefe
| 203414 ||  || — || December 14, 2001 || Socorro || LINEAR || FLO || align=right | 1.2 km || 
|-id=415 bgcolor=#fefefe
| 203415 ||  || — || December 14, 2001 || Socorro || LINEAR || — || align=right | 1.0 km || 
|-id=416 bgcolor=#fefefe
| 203416 ||  || — || December 14, 2001 || Socorro || LINEAR || — || align=right | 1.4 km || 
|-id=417 bgcolor=#fefefe
| 203417 ||  || — || December 14, 2001 || Socorro || LINEAR || V || align=right | 1.1 km || 
|-id=418 bgcolor=#fefefe
| 203418 ||  || — || December 11, 2001 || Socorro || LINEAR || — || align=right | 1.1 km || 
|-id=419 bgcolor=#fefefe
| 203419 ||  || — || December 11, 2001 || Socorro || LINEAR || V || align=right data-sort-value="0.95" | 950 m || 
|-id=420 bgcolor=#fefefe
| 203420 ||  || — || December 11, 2001 || Socorro || LINEAR || — || align=right data-sort-value="0.99" | 990 m || 
|-id=421 bgcolor=#fefefe
| 203421 ||  || — || December 11, 2001 || Socorro || LINEAR || — || align=right | 1.2 km || 
|-id=422 bgcolor=#fefefe
| 203422 ||  || — || December 15, 2001 || Socorro || LINEAR || NYS || align=right data-sort-value="0.65" | 650 m || 
|-id=423 bgcolor=#fefefe
| 203423 ||  || — || December 15, 2001 || Socorro || LINEAR || — || align=right | 1.1 km || 
|-id=424 bgcolor=#fefefe
| 203424 ||  || — || December 15, 2001 || Socorro || LINEAR || NYS || align=right | 1.2 km || 
|-id=425 bgcolor=#fefefe
| 203425 ||  || — || December 14, 2001 || Socorro || LINEAR || FLO || align=right | 1.1 km || 
|-id=426 bgcolor=#fefefe
| 203426 ||  || — || December 14, 2001 || Socorro || LINEAR || V || align=right | 1.1 km || 
|-id=427 bgcolor=#fefefe
| 203427 ||  || — || December 14, 2001 || Socorro || LINEAR || NYS || align=right data-sort-value="0.76" | 760 m || 
|-id=428 bgcolor=#d6d6d6
| 203428 ||  || — || December 14, 2001 || Anderson Mesa || LONEOS || 7:4 || align=right | 7.6 km || 
|-id=429 bgcolor=#fefefe
| 203429 ||  || — || December 14, 2001 || Palomar || NEAT || — || align=right | 1.2 km || 
|-id=430 bgcolor=#fefefe
| 203430 ||  || — || December 18, 2001 || Socorro || LINEAR || — || align=right | 1.9 km || 
|-id=431 bgcolor=#fefefe
| 203431 ||  || — || December 17, 2001 || Socorro || LINEAR || V || align=right | 1.2 km || 
|-id=432 bgcolor=#fefefe
| 203432 ||  || — || December 20, 2001 || Socorro || LINEAR || PHO || align=right | 1.9 km || 
|-id=433 bgcolor=#fefefe
| 203433 ||  || — || December 17, 2001 || Palomar || NEAT || NYS || align=right data-sort-value="0.91" | 910 m || 
|-id=434 bgcolor=#fefefe
| 203434 ||  || — || December 17, 2001 || Kitt Peak || Spacewatch || — || align=right | 1.0 km || 
|-id=435 bgcolor=#fefefe
| 203435 ||  || — || December 17, 2001 || Socorro || LINEAR || — || align=right data-sort-value="0.89" | 890 m || 
|-id=436 bgcolor=#fefefe
| 203436 ||  || — || December 18, 2001 || Socorro || LINEAR || — || align=right | 1.4 km || 
|-id=437 bgcolor=#fefefe
| 203437 ||  || — || December 18, 2001 || Socorro || LINEAR || V || align=right | 1.0 km || 
|-id=438 bgcolor=#fefefe
| 203438 ||  || — || December 18, 2001 || Socorro || LINEAR || — || align=right | 1.4 km || 
|-id=439 bgcolor=#fefefe
| 203439 ||  || — || December 18, 2001 || Socorro || LINEAR || FLO || align=right | 1.0 km || 
|-id=440 bgcolor=#fefefe
| 203440 ||  || — || December 18, 2001 || Socorro || LINEAR || — || align=right | 1.0 km || 
|-id=441 bgcolor=#fefefe
| 203441 ||  || — || December 18, 2001 || Socorro || LINEAR || FLO || align=right data-sort-value="0.90" | 900 m || 
|-id=442 bgcolor=#fefefe
| 203442 ||  || — || December 18, 2001 || Socorro || LINEAR || FLO || align=right | 1.1 km || 
|-id=443 bgcolor=#fefefe
| 203443 ||  || — || December 18, 2001 || Socorro || LINEAR || — || align=right data-sort-value="0.94" | 940 m || 
|-id=444 bgcolor=#fefefe
| 203444 ||  || — || December 18, 2001 || Socorro || LINEAR || V || align=right | 1.6 km || 
|-id=445 bgcolor=#fefefe
| 203445 ||  || — || December 18, 2001 || Socorro || LINEAR || NYS || align=right data-sort-value="0.88" | 880 m || 
|-id=446 bgcolor=#fefefe
| 203446 ||  || — || December 18, 2001 || Socorro || LINEAR || — || align=right | 1.2 km || 
|-id=447 bgcolor=#fefefe
| 203447 ||  || — || December 18, 2001 || Socorro || LINEAR || NYS || align=right | 1.1 km || 
|-id=448 bgcolor=#fefefe
| 203448 ||  || — || December 18, 2001 || Socorro || LINEAR || — || align=right | 1.4 km || 
|-id=449 bgcolor=#fefefe
| 203449 ||  || — || December 18, 2001 || Socorro || LINEAR || V || align=right data-sort-value="0.88" | 880 m || 
|-id=450 bgcolor=#fefefe
| 203450 ||  || — || December 18, 2001 || Socorro || LINEAR || — || align=right | 1.4 km || 
|-id=451 bgcolor=#fefefe
| 203451 ||  || — || December 18, 2001 || Socorro || LINEAR || — || align=right | 1.0 km || 
|-id=452 bgcolor=#fefefe
| 203452 ||  || — || December 17, 2001 || Palomar || NEAT || — || align=right | 1.4 km || 
|-id=453 bgcolor=#fefefe
| 203453 ||  || — || December 18, 2001 || Palomar || NEAT || — || align=right data-sort-value="0.86" | 860 m || 
|-id=454 bgcolor=#fefefe
| 203454 ||  || — || December 18, 2001 || Palomar || NEAT || FLO || align=right | 1.2 km || 
|-id=455 bgcolor=#fefefe
| 203455 ||  || — || December 18, 2001 || Palomar || NEAT || — || align=right | 1.3 km || 
|-id=456 bgcolor=#fefefe
| 203456 ||  || — || December 17, 2001 || Socorro || LINEAR || FLO || align=right data-sort-value="0.91" | 910 m || 
|-id=457 bgcolor=#fefefe
| 203457 ||  || — || December 17, 2001 || Socorro || LINEAR || — || align=right | 1.0 km || 
|-id=458 bgcolor=#fefefe
| 203458 ||  || — || December 17, 2001 || Socorro || LINEAR || NYS || align=right | 2.8 km || 
|-id=459 bgcolor=#fefefe
| 203459 ||  || — || December 18, 2001 || Socorro || LINEAR || — || align=right | 1.4 km || 
|-id=460 bgcolor=#fefefe
| 203460 ||  || — || December 18, 2001 || Socorro || LINEAR || V || align=right | 1.2 km || 
|-id=461 bgcolor=#fefefe
| 203461 ||  || — || December 17, 2001 || Socorro || LINEAR || FLO || align=right | 1.0 km || 
|-id=462 bgcolor=#fefefe
| 203462 ||  || — || December 17, 2001 || Socorro || LINEAR || V || align=right | 1.4 km || 
|-id=463 bgcolor=#fefefe
| 203463 ||  || — || December 17, 2001 || Socorro || LINEAR || — || align=right | 1.0 km || 
|-id=464 bgcolor=#fefefe
| 203464 ||  || — || December 19, 2001 || Socorro || LINEAR || NYS || align=right data-sort-value="0.88" | 880 m || 
|-id=465 bgcolor=#fefefe
| 203465 ||  || — || December 22, 2001 || Socorro || LINEAR || — || align=right | 1.3 km || 
|-id=466 bgcolor=#fefefe
| 203466 ||  || — || December 18, 2001 || Kitt Peak || Spacewatch || V || align=right | 1.3 km || 
|-id=467 bgcolor=#FA8072
| 203467 ||  || — || December 19, 2001 || Palomar || NEAT || — || align=right | 1.5 km || 
|-id=468 bgcolor=#fefefe
| 203468 ||  || — || December 19, 2001 || Palomar || NEAT || — || align=right | 1.4 km || 
|-id=469 bgcolor=#fefefe
| 203469 ||  || — || December 19, 2001 || Palomar || NEAT || V || align=right | 1.1 km || 
|-id=470 bgcolor=#fefefe
| 203470 || 2002 AU || — || January 6, 2002 || Oaxaca || J. M. Roe || FLO || align=right data-sort-value="0.85" | 850 m || 
|-id=471 bgcolor=#FFC2E0
| 203471 ||  || — || January 8, 2002 || Socorro || LINEAR || ATE || align=right data-sort-value="0.47" | 470 m || 
|-id=472 bgcolor=#fefefe
| 203472 ||  || — || January 12, 2002 || Eskridge || Farpoint Obs. || — || align=right | 1.3 km || 
|-id=473 bgcolor=#fefefe
| 203473 ||  || — || January 9, 2002 || Socorro || LINEAR || NYS || align=right data-sort-value="0.93" | 930 m || 
|-id=474 bgcolor=#fefefe
| 203474 ||  || — || January 5, 2002 || Haleakala || NEAT || — || align=right | 1.2 km || 
|-id=475 bgcolor=#fefefe
| 203475 ||  || — || January 8, 2002 || Socorro || LINEAR || V || align=right | 1.2 km || 
|-id=476 bgcolor=#fefefe
| 203476 ||  || — || January 10, 2002 || Palomar || NEAT || FLO || align=right | 1.6 km || 
|-id=477 bgcolor=#fefefe
| 203477 ||  || — || January 9, 2002 || Socorro || LINEAR || — || align=right | 1.4 km || 
|-id=478 bgcolor=#fefefe
| 203478 ||  || — || January 9, 2002 || Socorro || LINEAR || NYS || align=right data-sort-value="0.90" | 900 m || 
|-id=479 bgcolor=#fefefe
| 203479 ||  || — || January 9, 2002 || Socorro || LINEAR || — || align=right | 1.4 km || 
|-id=480 bgcolor=#fefefe
| 203480 ||  || — || January 9, 2002 || Socorro || LINEAR || — || align=right | 1.1 km || 
|-id=481 bgcolor=#fefefe
| 203481 ||  || — || January 9, 2002 || Socorro || LINEAR || NYS || align=right | 2.7 km || 
|-id=482 bgcolor=#fefefe
| 203482 ||  || — || January 9, 2002 || Socorro || LINEAR || NYS || align=right data-sort-value="0.99" | 990 m || 
|-id=483 bgcolor=#fefefe
| 203483 ||  || — || January 9, 2002 || Socorro || LINEAR || FLO || align=right | 1.1 km || 
|-id=484 bgcolor=#fefefe
| 203484 ||  || — || January 9, 2002 || Socorro || LINEAR || — || align=right | 1.0 km || 
|-id=485 bgcolor=#fefefe
| 203485 ||  || — || January 11, 2002 || Socorro || LINEAR || MAS || align=right data-sort-value="0.83" | 830 m || 
|-id=486 bgcolor=#fefefe
| 203486 ||  || — || January 11, 2002 || Socorro || LINEAR || V || align=right | 1.2 km || 
|-id=487 bgcolor=#fefefe
| 203487 ||  || — || January 11, 2002 || Socorro || LINEAR || — || align=right | 1.2 km || 
|-id=488 bgcolor=#fefefe
| 203488 ||  || — || January 8, 2002 || Socorro || LINEAR || FLO || align=right | 1.1 km || 
|-id=489 bgcolor=#fefefe
| 203489 ||  || — || January 8, 2002 || Socorro || LINEAR || FLO || align=right | 1.2 km || 
|-id=490 bgcolor=#fefefe
| 203490 ||  || — || January 9, 2002 || Socorro || LINEAR || — || align=right | 1.1 km || 
|-id=491 bgcolor=#fefefe
| 203491 ||  || — || January 13, 2002 || Socorro || LINEAR || — || align=right | 1.4 km || 
|-id=492 bgcolor=#fefefe
| 203492 ||  || — || January 8, 2002 || Socorro || LINEAR || — || align=right | 1.4 km || 
|-id=493 bgcolor=#fefefe
| 203493 ||  || — || January 8, 2002 || Socorro || LINEAR || — || align=right | 1.6 km || 
|-id=494 bgcolor=#fefefe
| 203494 ||  || — || January 8, 2002 || Socorro || LINEAR || — || align=right | 1.4 km || 
|-id=495 bgcolor=#fefefe
| 203495 ||  || — || January 8, 2002 || Socorro || LINEAR || — || align=right | 1.2 km || 
|-id=496 bgcolor=#fefefe
| 203496 ||  || — || January 8, 2002 || Socorro || LINEAR || V || align=right data-sort-value="0.94" | 940 m || 
|-id=497 bgcolor=#fefefe
| 203497 ||  || — || January 9, 2002 || Socorro || LINEAR || — || align=right | 1.3 km || 
|-id=498 bgcolor=#fefefe
| 203498 ||  || — || January 9, 2002 || Socorro || LINEAR || NYS || align=right | 1.0 km || 
|-id=499 bgcolor=#fefefe
| 203499 ||  || — || January 9, 2002 || Socorro || LINEAR || V || align=right | 1.0 km || 
|-id=500 bgcolor=#fefefe
| 203500 ||  || — || January 9, 2002 || Socorro || LINEAR || ERI || align=right | 3.4 km || 
|}

203501–203600 

|-bgcolor=#fefefe
| 203501 ||  || — || January 9, 2002 || Socorro || LINEAR || V || align=right | 1.3 km || 
|-id=502 bgcolor=#fefefe
| 203502 ||  || — || January 9, 2002 || Socorro || LINEAR || — || align=right | 1.6 km || 
|-id=503 bgcolor=#fefefe
| 203503 ||  || — || January 13, 2002 || Socorro || LINEAR || — || align=right | 1.1 km || 
|-id=504 bgcolor=#fefefe
| 203504 ||  || — || January 13, 2002 || Socorro || LINEAR || — || align=right | 1.4 km || 
|-id=505 bgcolor=#fefefe
| 203505 ||  || — || January 12, 2002 || Palomar || NEAT || — || align=right | 1.3 km || 
|-id=506 bgcolor=#fefefe
| 203506 ||  || — || January 12, 2002 || Palomar || NEAT || — || align=right | 1.3 km || 
|-id=507 bgcolor=#fefefe
| 203507 ||  || — || January 13, 2002 || Socorro || LINEAR || NYS || align=right data-sort-value="0.83" | 830 m || 
|-id=508 bgcolor=#fefefe
| 203508 ||  || — || January 13, 2002 || Socorro || LINEAR || — || align=right data-sort-value="0.90" | 900 m || 
|-id=509 bgcolor=#fefefe
| 203509 ||  || — || January 14, 2002 || Socorro || LINEAR || ERI || align=right | 3.1 km || 
|-id=510 bgcolor=#fefefe
| 203510 ||  || — || January 14, 2002 || Socorro || LINEAR || — || align=right | 1.9 km || 
|-id=511 bgcolor=#fefefe
| 203511 ||  || — || January 13, 2002 || Socorro || LINEAR || — || align=right | 1.1 km || 
|-id=512 bgcolor=#fefefe
| 203512 ||  || — || January 13, 2002 || Socorro || LINEAR || — || align=right | 1.3 km || 
|-id=513 bgcolor=#fefefe
| 203513 ||  || — || January 13, 2002 || Socorro || LINEAR || — || align=right data-sort-value="0.87" | 870 m || 
|-id=514 bgcolor=#fefefe
| 203514 ||  || — || January 13, 2002 || Socorro || LINEAR || — || align=right | 1.1 km || 
|-id=515 bgcolor=#fefefe
| 203515 ||  || — || January 13, 2002 || Socorro || LINEAR || — || align=right | 3.6 km || 
|-id=516 bgcolor=#fefefe
| 203516 ||  || — || January 13, 2002 || Socorro || LINEAR || — || align=right | 1.3 km || 
|-id=517 bgcolor=#fefefe
| 203517 ||  || — || January 13, 2002 || Socorro || LINEAR || — || align=right | 1.7 km || 
|-id=518 bgcolor=#fefefe
| 203518 ||  || — || January 14, 2002 || Socorro || LINEAR || — || align=right data-sort-value="0.95" | 950 m || 
|-id=519 bgcolor=#fefefe
| 203519 ||  || — || January 14, 2002 || Socorro || LINEAR || — || align=right | 1.1 km || 
|-id=520 bgcolor=#fefefe
| 203520 ||  || — || January 14, 2002 || Socorro || LINEAR || — || align=right | 1.5 km || 
|-id=521 bgcolor=#fefefe
| 203521 ||  || — || January 6, 2002 || Palomar || NEAT || V || align=right | 1.0 km || 
|-id=522 bgcolor=#fefefe
| 203522 ||  || — || January 8, 2002 || Socorro || LINEAR || FLO || align=right data-sort-value="0.92" | 920 m || 
|-id=523 bgcolor=#fefefe
| 203523 ||  || — || January 9, 2002 || Socorro || LINEAR || — || align=right | 1.1 km || 
|-id=524 bgcolor=#fefefe
| 203524 ||  || — || January 18, 2002 || Socorro || LINEAR || — || align=right | 1.5 km || 
|-id=525 bgcolor=#fefefe
| 203525 ||  || — || January 19, 2002 || Socorro || LINEAR || — || align=right | 1.9 km || 
|-id=526 bgcolor=#fefefe
| 203526 ||  || — || January 19, 2002 || Socorro || LINEAR || — || align=right | 1.3 km || 
|-id=527 bgcolor=#fefefe
| 203527 ||  || — || January 22, 2002 || Socorro || LINEAR || NYS || align=right | 1.0 km || 
|-id=528 bgcolor=#fefefe
| 203528 ||  || — || January 22, 2002 || Socorro || LINEAR || — || align=right | 1.2 km || 
|-id=529 bgcolor=#fefefe
| 203529 ||  || — || January 22, 2002 || Socorro || LINEAR || NYS || align=right | 1.0 km || 
|-id=530 bgcolor=#fefefe
| 203530 ||  || — || January 20, 2002 || Anderson Mesa || LONEOS || — || align=right | 1.4 km || 
|-id=531 bgcolor=#fefefe
| 203531 ||  || — || February 6, 2002 || Kitt Peak || Spacewatch || V || align=right | 1.2 km || 
|-id=532 bgcolor=#fefefe
| 203532 ||  || — || February 8, 2002 || Fountain Hills || C. W. Juels, P. R. Holvorcem || — || align=right | 1.2 km || 
|-id=533 bgcolor=#fefefe
| 203533 ||  || — || February 6, 2002 || Socorro || LINEAR || — || align=right | 1.3 km || 
|-id=534 bgcolor=#fefefe
| 203534 ||  || — || February 6, 2002 || Socorro || LINEAR || V || align=right | 1.3 km || 
|-id=535 bgcolor=#fefefe
| 203535 ||  || — || February 5, 2002 || Palomar || NEAT || NYS || align=right | 1.1 km || 
|-id=536 bgcolor=#fefefe
| 203536 ||  || — || February 5, 2002 || Palomar || NEAT || V || align=right | 1.1 km || 
|-id=537 bgcolor=#fefefe
| 203537 ||  || — || February 6, 2002 || Socorro || LINEAR || V || align=right | 1.4 km || 
|-id=538 bgcolor=#fefefe
| 203538 ||  || — || February 7, 2002 || Socorro || LINEAR || NYS || align=right data-sort-value="0.93" | 930 m || 
|-id=539 bgcolor=#fefefe
| 203539 ||  || — || February 7, 2002 || Palomar || NEAT || — || align=right | 1.1 km || 
|-id=540 bgcolor=#fefefe
| 203540 ||  || — || February 3, 2002 || Haleakala || NEAT || — || align=right | 2.5 km || 
|-id=541 bgcolor=#fefefe
| 203541 ||  || — || February 3, 2002 || Haleakala || NEAT || — || align=right | 1.3 km || 
|-id=542 bgcolor=#fefefe
| 203542 ||  || — || February 7, 2002 || Socorro || LINEAR || — || align=right | 1.00 km || 
|-id=543 bgcolor=#fefefe
| 203543 ||  || — || February 13, 2002 || Desert Eagle || W. K. Y. Yeung || ERI || align=right | 3.4 km || 
|-id=544 bgcolor=#fefefe
| 203544 ||  || — || February 7, 2002 || Socorro || LINEAR || V || align=right | 1.2 km || 
|-id=545 bgcolor=#fefefe
| 203545 ||  || — || February 7, 2002 || Socorro || LINEAR || — || align=right data-sort-value="0.96" | 960 m || 
|-id=546 bgcolor=#fefefe
| 203546 ||  || — || February 7, 2002 || Socorro || LINEAR || V || align=right | 1.2 km || 
|-id=547 bgcolor=#fefefe
| 203547 ||  || — || February 7, 2002 || Socorro || LINEAR || — || align=right data-sort-value="0.86" | 860 m || 
|-id=548 bgcolor=#fefefe
| 203548 ||  || — || February 7, 2002 || Socorro || LINEAR || V || align=right data-sort-value="0.99" | 990 m || 
|-id=549 bgcolor=#fefefe
| 203549 ||  || — || February 7, 2002 || Socorro || LINEAR || NYS || align=right | 3.3 km || 
|-id=550 bgcolor=#fefefe
| 203550 ||  || — || February 7, 2002 || Socorro || LINEAR || FLO || align=right | 1.1 km || 
|-id=551 bgcolor=#fefefe
| 203551 ||  || — || February 7, 2002 || Socorro || LINEAR || MAS || align=right | 1.0 km || 
|-id=552 bgcolor=#fefefe
| 203552 ||  || — || February 7, 2002 || Socorro || LINEAR || MAS || align=right data-sort-value="0.95" | 950 m || 
|-id=553 bgcolor=#fefefe
| 203553 ||  || — || February 7, 2002 || Socorro || LINEAR || — || align=right | 1.4 km || 
|-id=554 bgcolor=#fefefe
| 203554 ||  || — || February 7, 2002 || Socorro || LINEAR || MAS || align=right | 1.0 km || 
|-id=555 bgcolor=#fefefe
| 203555 ||  || — || February 7, 2002 || Socorro || LINEAR || MAS || align=right | 1.0 km || 
|-id=556 bgcolor=#fefefe
| 203556 ||  || — || February 7, 2002 || Socorro || LINEAR || NYS || align=right | 1.3 km || 
|-id=557 bgcolor=#fefefe
| 203557 ||  || — || February 7, 2002 || Socorro || LINEAR || NYS || align=right data-sort-value="0.82" | 820 m || 
|-id=558 bgcolor=#fefefe
| 203558 ||  || — || February 7, 2002 || Socorro || LINEAR || NYS || align=right data-sort-value="0.85" | 850 m || 
|-id=559 bgcolor=#fefefe
| 203559 ||  || — || February 8, 2002 || Socorro || LINEAR || — || align=right | 1.2 km || 
|-id=560 bgcolor=#fefefe
| 203560 ||  || — || February 8, 2002 || Socorro || LINEAR || — || align=right | 1.4 km || 
|-id=561 bgcolor=#fefefe
| 203561 ||  || — || February 7, 2002 || Socorro || LINEAR || NYS || align=right data-sort-value="0.86" | 860 m || 
|-id=562 bgcolor=#fefefe
| 203562 ||  || — || February 7, 2002 || Socorro || LINEAR || V || align=right | 1.1 km || 
|-id=563 bgcolor=#fefefe
| 203563 ||  || — || February 7, 2002 || Socorro || LINEAR || — || align=right | 1.3 km || 
|-id=564 bgcolor=#fefefe
| 203564 ||  || — || February 7, 2002 || Socorro || LINEAR || MAS || align=right data-sort-value="0.95" | 950 m || 
|-id=565 bgcolor=#fefefe
| 203565 ||  || — || February 7, 2002 || Socorro || LINEAR || MAS || align=right data-sort-value="0.98" | 980 m || 
|-id=566 bgcolor=#fefefe
| 203566 ||  || — || February 7, 2002 || Socorro || LINEAR || — || align=right | 1.3 km || 
|-id=567 bgcolor=#fefefe
| 203567 ||  || — || February 9, 2002 || Socorro || LINEAR || — || align=right | 1.4 km || 
|-id=568 bgcolor=#fefefe
| 203568 ||  || — || February 10, 2002 || Socorro || LINEAR || — || align=right | 1.7 km || 
|-id=569 bgcolor=#fefefe
| 203569 ||  || — || February 10, 2002 || Socorro || LINEAR || MAS || align=right | 1.0 km || 
|-id=570 bgcolor=#fefefe
| 203570 ||  || — || February 11, 2002 || Socorro || LINEAR || V || align=right data-sort-value="0.81" | 810 m || 
|-id=571 bgcolor=#fefefe
| 203571 ||  || — || February 6, 2002 || Socorro || LINEAR || — || align=right | 2.7 km || 
|-id=572 bgcolor=#fefefe
| 203572 ||  || — || February 8, 2002 || Socorro || LINEAR || — || align=right | 1.3 km || 
|-id=573 bgcolor=#fefefe
| 203573 ||  || — || February 10, 2002 || Socorro || LINEAR || MAS || align=right data-sort-value="0.94" | 940 m || 
|-id=574 bgcolor=#fefefe
| 203574 ||  || — || February 10, 2002 || Socorro || LINEAR || NYS || align=right data-sort-value="0.92" | 920 m || 
|-id=575 bgcolor=#fefefe
| 203575 ||  || — || February 10, 2002 || Socorro || LINEAR || NYS || align=right data-sort-value="0.81" | 810 m || 
|-id=576 bgcolor=#fefefe
| 203576 ||  || — || February 10, 2002 || Socorro || LINEAR || NYS || align=right data-sort-value="0.96" | 960 m || 
|-id=577 bgcolor=#fefefe
| 203577 ||  || — || February 10, 2002 || Socorro || LINEAR || — || align=right | 1.6 km || 
|-id=578 bgcolor=#fefefe
| 203578 ||  || — || February 10, 2002 || Socorro || LINEAR || MAS || align=right data-sort-value="0.97" | 970 m || 
|-id=579 bgcolor=#E9E9E9
| 203579 ||  || — || February 10, 2002 || Socorro || LINEAR || — || align=right | 1.6 km || 
|-id=580 bgcolor=#fefefe
| 203580 ||  || — || February 10, 2002 || Socorro || LINEAR || — || align=right | 1.2 km || 
|-id=581 bgcolor=#fefefe
| 203581 ||  || — || February 11, 2002 || Socorro || LINEAR || NYS || align=right data-sort-value="0.93" | 930 m || 
|-id=582 bgcolor=#fefefe
| 203582 ||  || — || February 10, 2002 || Socorro || LINEAR || V || align=right | 1.1 km || 
|-id=583 bgcolor=#fefefe
| 203583 ||  || — || February 11, 2002 || Socorro || LINEAR || — || align=right | 1.3 km || 
|-id=584 bgcolor=#fefefe
| 203584 ||  || — || February 11, 2002 || Socorro || LINEAR || NYS || align=right data-sort-value="0.86" | 860 m || 
|-id=585 bgcolor=#fefefe
| 203585 ||  || — || February 9, 2002 || Socorro || LINEAR || — || align=right | 1.3 km || 
|-id=586 bgcolor=#fefefe
| 203586 ||  || — || February 11, 2002 || Socorro || LINEAR || NYS || align=right | 1.0 km || 
|-id=587 bgcolor=#fefefe
| 203587 ||  || — || February 13, 2002 || Kitt Peak || Spacewatch || EUT || align=right data-sort-value="0.83" | 830 m || 
|-id=588 bgcolor=#fefefe
| 203588 ||  || — || February 5, 2002 || Anderson Mesa || LONEOS || FLO || align=right | 1.2 km || 
|-id=589 bgcolor=#fefefe
| 203589 ||  || — || February 5, 2002 || Anderson Mesa || LONEOS || — || align=right | 1.2 km || 
|-id=590 bgcolor=#E9E9E9
| 203590 ||  || — || February 9, 2002 || Kvistaberg || UDAS || — || align=right | 1.3 km || 
|-id=591 bgcolor=#fefefe
| 203591 ||  || — || February 7, 2002 || Palomar || NEAT || NYS || align=right data-sort-value="0.72" | 720 m || 
|-id=592 bgcolor=#fefefe
| 203592 ||  || — || February 7, 2002 || Kitt Peak || Spacewatch || — || align=right | 1.6 km || 
|-id=593 bgcolor=#fefefe
| 203593 ||  || — || February 8, 2002 || Kitt Peak || Spacewatch || — || align=right | 2.9 km || 
|-id=594 bgcolor=#fefefe
| 203594 ||  || — || February 9, 2002 || Socorro || LINEAR || — || align=right | 1.4 km || 
|-id=595 bgcolor=#fefefe
| 203595 ||  || — || February 11, 2002 || Socorro || LINEAR || NYS || align=right | 1.8 km || 
|-id=596 bgcolor=#fefefe
| 203596 ||  || — || February 12, 2002 || Socorro || LINEAR || — || align=right | 1.8 km || 
|-id=597 bgcolor=#fefefe
| 203597 ||  || — || February 11, 2002 || Socorro || LINEAR || MAS || align=right data-sort-value="0.93" | 930 m || 
|-id=598 bgcolor=#fefefe
| 203598 ||  || — || February 6, 2002 || Palomar || NEAT || — || align=right | 1.4 km || 
|-id=599 bgcolor=#fefefe
| 203599 ||  || — || February 10, 2002 || Socorro || LINEAR || FLO || align=right data-sort-value="0.83" | 830 m || 
|-id=600 bgcolor=#fefefe
| 203600 ||  || — || February 7, 2002 || Haleakala || NEAT || — || align=right | 1.4 km || 
|}

203601–203700 

|-bgcolor=#fefefe
| 203601 ||  || — || February 19, 2002 || Desert Eagle || W. K. Y. Yeung || NYS || align=right | 1.1 km || 
|-id=602 bgcolor=#fefefe
| 203602 Danjoyce || 2002 ED ||  || March 4, 2002 || Desert Moon || B. L. Stevens || — || align=right | 1.1 km || 
|-id=603 bgcolor=#fefefe
| 203603 ||  || — || March 9, 2002 || Bohyunsan || Bohyunsan Obs. || — || align=right data-sort-value="0.98" | 980 m || 
|-id=604 bgcolor=#fefefe
| 203604 ||  || — || March 10, 2002 || Haleakala || NEAT || ERI || align=right | 1.9 km || 
|-id=605 bgcolor=#fefefe
| 203605 ||  || — || March 5, 2002 || Kitt Peak || Spacewatch || NYS || align=right data-sort-value="0.76" | 760 m || 
|-id=606 bgcolor=#fefefe
| 203606 ||  || — || March 9, 2002 || Socorro || LINEAR || MAS || align=right | 3.7 km || 
|-id=607 bgcolor=#fefefe
| 203607 ||  || — || March 13, 2002 || Socorro || LINEAR || — || align=right | 1.2 km || 
|-id=608 bgcolor=#fefefe
| 203608 ||  || — || March 13, 2002 || Socorro || LINEAR || V || align=right | 1.0 km || 
|-id=609 bgcolor=#fefefe
| 203609 ||  || — || March 13, 2002 || Socorro || LINEAR || NYS || align=right data-sort-value="0.94" | 940 m || 
|-id=610 bgcolor=#fefefe
| 203610 ||  || — || March 13, 2002 || Socorro || LINEAR || — || align=right | 1.2 km || 
|-id=611 bgcolor=#fefefe
| 203611 ||  || — || March 13, 2002 || Socorro || LINEAR || — || align=right | 1.3 km || 
|-id=612 bgcolor=#E9E9E9
| 203612 ||  || — || March 11, 2002 || Kitt Peak || Spacewatch || — || align=right | 2.7 km || 
|-id=613 bgcolor=#fefefe
| 203613 ||  || — || March 13, 2002 || Palomar || NEAT || NYS || align=right data-sort-value="0.84" | 840 m || 
|-id=614 bgcolor=#fefefe
| 203614 ||  || — || March 9, 2002 || Socorro || LINEAR || NYS || align=right | 1.2 km || 
|-id=615 bgcolor=#fefefe
| 203615 ||  || — || March 12, 2002 || Socorro || LINEAR || — || align=right | 1.2 km || 
|-id=616 bgcolor=#fefefe
| 203616 ||  || — || March 12, 2002 || Socorro || LINEAR || — || align=right | 2.9 km || 
|-id=617 bgcolor=#fefefe
| 203617 ||  || — || March 9, 2002 || Palomar || NEAT || EUT || align=right data-sort-value="0.69" | 690 m || 
|-id=618 bgcolor=#fefefe
| 203618 ||  || — || March 10, 2002 || Haleakala || NEAT || V || align=right | 1.4 km || 
|-id=619 bgcolor=#fefefe
| 203619 ||  || — || March 11, 2002 || Kitt Peak || Spacewatch || ERI || align=right | 2.0 km || 
|-id=620 bgcolor=#fefefe
| 203620 ||  || — || March 11, 2002 || Palomar || NEAT || CLA || align=right | 2.1 km || 
|-id=621 bgcolor=#fefefe
| 203621 ||  || — || March 13, 2002 || Palomar || NEAT || MAS || align=right | 1.0 km || 
|-id=622 bgcolor=#E9E9E9
| 203622 ||  || — || March 13, 2002 || Palomar || NEAT || — || align=right | 1.3 km || 
|-id=623 bgcolor=#fefefe
| 203623 || 2002 FU || — || March 18, 2002 || Desert Eagle || W. K. Y. Yeung || — || align=right | 1.3 km || 
|-id=624 bgcolor=#fefefe
| 203624 ||  || — || March 20, 2002 || Desert Eagle || W. K. Y. Yeung || V || align=right | 1.8 km || 
|-id=625 bgcolor=#fefefe
| 203625 ||  || — || March 16, 2002 || Socorro || LINEAR || NYS || align=right | 1.3 km || 
|-id=626 bgcolor=#fefefe
| 203626 ||  || — || March 16, 2002 || Haleakala || NEAT || — || align=right | 1.4 km || 
|-id=627 bgcolor=#fefefe
| 203627 ||  || — || March 18, 2002 || Socorro || LINEAR || — || align=right | 2.5 km || 
|-id=628 bgcolor=#fefefe
| 203628 ||  || — || March 19, 2002 || Socorro || LINEAR || — || align=right | 1.5 km || 
|-id=629 bgcolor=#fefefe
| 203629 ||  || — || March 19, 2002 || Palomar || NEAT || CIM || align=right | 4.0 km || 
|-id=630 bgcolor=#E9E9E9
| 203630 ||  || — || March 20, 2002 || Socorro || LINEAR || — || align=right | 1.8 km || 
|-id=631 bgcolor=#fefefe
| 203631 ||  || — || March 20, 2002 || Socorro || LINEAR || V || align=right | 1.2 km || 
|-id=632 bgcolor=#fefefe
| 203632 ||  || — || March 30, 2002 || Palomar || NEAT || — || align=right | 1.2 km || 
|-id=633 bgcolor=#fefefe
| 203633 ||  || — || March 30, 2002 || Palomar || NEAT || — || align=right data-sort-value="0.99" | 990 m || 
|-id=634 bgcolor=#fefefe
| 203634 ||  || — || April 6, 2002 || Socorro || LINEAR || H || align=right | 1.1 km || 
|-id=635 bgcolor=#fefefe
| 203635 ||  || — || April 13, 2002 || Kitt Peak || Spacewatch || — || align=right data-sort-value="0.95" | 950 m || 
|-id=636 bgcolor=#fefefe
| 203636 ||  || — || April 4, 2002 || Palomar || NEAT || NYS || align=right | 1.0 km || 
|-id=637 bgcolor=#fefefe
| 203637 ||  || — || April 4, 2002 || Palomar || NEAT || MAS || align=right | 1.0 km || 
|-id=638 bgcolor=#fefefe
| 203638 ||  || — || April 4, 2002 || Palomar || NEAT || MAS || align=right | 1.2 km || 
|-id=639 bgcolor=#fefefe
| 203639 ||  || — || April 8, 2002 || Palomar || NEAT || — || align=right | 1.5 km || 
|-id=640 bgcolor=#E9E9E9
| 203640 ||  || — || April 9, 2002 || Socorro || LINEAR || — || align=right | 1.6 km || 
|-id=641 bgcolor=#E9E9E9
| 203641 ||  || — || April 10, 2002 || Socorro || LINEAR || — || align=right | 2.3 km || 
|-id=642 bgcolor=#fefefe
| 203642 ||  || — || April 10, 2002 || Socorro || LINEAR || — || align=right | 1.3 km || 
|-id=643 bgcolor=#fefefe
| 203643 ||  || — || April 9, 2002 || Socorro || LINEAR || — || align=right | 1.0 km || 
|-id=644 bgcolor=#fefefe
| 203644 ||  || — || April 10, 2002 || Socorro || LINEAR || NYS || align=right data-sort-value="0.92" | 920 m || 
|-id=645 bgcolor=#E9E9E9
| 203645 ||  || — || April 10, 2002 || Socorro || LINEAR || — || align=right | 2.4 km || 
|-id=646 bgcolor=#fefefe
| 203646 ||  || — || April 10, 2002 || Socorro || LINEAR || NYS || align=right data-sort-value="0.86" | 860 m || 
|-id=647 bgcolor=#fefefe
| 203647 ||  || — || April 11, 2002 || Socorro || LINEAR || — || align=right | 1.3 km || 
|-id=648 bgcolor=#fefefe
| 203648 ||  || — || April 11, 2002 || Socorro || LINEAR || NYS || align=right | 2.5 km || 
|-id=649 bgcolor=#fefefe
| 203649 ||  || — || April 13, 2002 || Palomar || NEAT || MAS || align=right | 1.1 km || 
|-id=650 bgcolor=#E9E9E9
| 203650 ||  || — || April 14, 2002 || Palomar || NEAT || — || align=right | 2.4 km || 
|-id=651 bgcolor=#fefefe
| 203651 ||  || — || April 14, 2002 || Kitt Peak || Spacewatch || NYS || align=right data-sort-value="0.97" | 970 m || 
|-id=652 bgcolor=#fefefe
| 203652 ||  || — || April 14, 2002 || Palomar || NEAT || — || align=right | 2.4 km || 
|-id=653 bgcolor=#fefefe
| 203653 ||  || — || April 10, 2002 || Socorro || LINEAR || MAS || align=right | 1.0 km || 
|-id=654 bgcolor=#E9E9E9
| 203654 ||  || — || April 11, 2002 || Socorro || LINEAR || — || align=right | 1.7 km || 
|-id=655 bgcolor=#fefefe
| 203655 ||  || — || April 17, 2002 || Socorro || LINEAR || MAS || align=right | 1.2 km || 
|-id=656 bgcolor=#fefefe
| 203656 ||  || — || May 7, 2002 || Socorro || LINEAR || — || align=right | 1.6 km || 
|-id=657 bgcolor=#fefefe
| 203657 ||  || — || May 8, 2002 || Socorro || LINEAR || V || align=right | 1.2 km || 
|-id=658 bgcolor=#E9E9E9
| 203658 ||  || — || May 7, 2002 || Palomar || NEAT || — || align=right | 1.4 km || 
|-id=659 bgcolor=#E9E9E9
| 203659 ||  || — || May 7, 2002 || Palomar || NEAT || — || align=right | 2.1 km || 
|-id=660 bgcolor=#fefefe
| 203660 ||  || — || May 6, 2002 || Palomar || NEAT || — || align=right | 1.7 km || 
|-id=661 bgcolor=#E9E9E9
| 203661 ||  || — || May 9, 2002 || Socorro || LINEAR || — || align=right | 1.4 km || 
|-id=662 bgcolor=#E9E9E9
| 203662 ||  || — || May 9, 2002 || Socorro || LINEAR || — || align=right | 1.7 km || 
|-id=663 bgcolor=#fefefe
| 203663 ||  || — || May 9, 2002 || Socorro || LINEAR || — || align=right | 1.3 km || 
|-id=664 bgcolor=#fefefe
| 203664 ||  || — || May 8, 2002 || Socorro || LINEAR || — || align=right | 4.1 km || 
|-id=665 bgcolor=#E9E9E9
| 203665 ||  || — || May 8, 2002 || Socorro || LINEAR || — || align=right | 2.9 km || 
|-id=666 bgcolor=#fefefe
| 203666 ||  || — || May 11, 2002 || Socorro || LINEAR || V || align=right | 1.2 km || 
|-id=667 bgcolor=#E9E9E9
| 203667 ||  || — || May 11, 2002 || Socorro || LINEAR || KON || align=right | 3.1 km || 
|-id=668 bgcolor=#E9E9E9
| 203668 ||  || — || May 11, 2002 || Socorro || LINEAR || GEF || align=right | 1.9 km || 
|-id=669 bgcolor=#E9E9E9
| 203669 ||  || — || May 15, 2002 || Socorro || LINEAR || — || align=right | 1.7 km || 
|-id=670 bgcolor=#E9E9E9
| 203670 ||  || — || May 5, 2002 || Kitt Peak || Spacewatch || — || align=right | 2.4 km || 
|-id=671 bgcolor=#E9E9E9
| 203671 ||  || — || May 6, 2002 || Palomar || NEAT || AER || align=right | 2.0 km || 
|-id=672 bgcolor=#fefefe
| 203672 ||  || — || May 9, 2002 || Palomar || NEAT || MAS || align=right | 1.0 km || 
|-id=673 bgcolor=#E9E9E9
| 203673 ||  || — || May 15, 2002 || Socorro || LINEAR || MAR || align=right | 1.6 km || 
|-id=674 bgcolor=#fefefe
| 203674 ||  || — || May 10, 2002 || Socorro || LINEAR || — || align=right | 1.2 km || 
|-id=675 bgcolor=#E9E9E9
| 203675 || 2002 LH || — || June 1, 2002 || Palomar || NEAT || — || align=right | 1.8 km || 
|-id=676 bgcolor=#E9E9E9
| 203676 ||  || — || June 1, 2002 || Palomar || NEAT || — || align=right | 3.0 km || 
|-id=677 bgcolor=#E9E9E9
| 203677 ||  || — || June 5, 2002 || Socorro || LINEAR || — || align=right | 3.5 km || 
|-id=678 bgcolor=#d6d6d6
| 203678 ||  || — || June 10, 2002 || Socorro || LINEAR || — || align=right | 5.6 km || 
|-id=679 bgcolor=#fefefe
| 203679 || 2002 MK || — || June 16, 2002 || Socorro || LINEAR || H || align=right | 1.1 km || 
|-id=680 bgcolor=#E9E9E9
| 203680 ||  || — || July 10, 2002 || Campo Imperatore || CINEOS || HEN || align=right | 1.5 km || 
|-id=681 bgcolor=#E9E9E9
| 203681 ||  || — || July 4, 2002 || Palomar || NEAT || DOR || align=right | 5.8 km || 
|-id=682 bgcolor=#E9E9E9
| 203682 ||  || — || July 4, 2002 || Palomar || NEAT || — || align=right | 4.3 km || 
|-id=683 bgcolor=#E9E9E9
| 203683 ||  || — || July 9, 2002 || Socorro || LINEAR || — || align=right | 2.2 km || 
|-id=684 bgcolor=#E9E9E9
| 203684 ||  || — || July 9, 2002 || Socorro || LINEAR || DOR || align=right | 5.6 km || 
|-id=685 bgcolor=#E9E9E9
| 203685 ||  || — || July 9, 2002 || Socorro || LINEAR || — || align=right | 1.8 km || 
|-id=686 bgcolor=#E9E9E9
| 203686 ||  || — || July 14, 2002 || Palomar || NEAT || — || align=right | 4.8 km || 
|-id=687 bgcolor=#d6d6d6
| 203687 ||  || — || July 13, 2002 || Socorro || LINEAR || — || align=right | 8.3 km || 
|-id=688 bgcolor=#d6d6d6
| 203688 ||  || — || July 13, 2002 || Socorro || LINEAR || MEL || align=right | 7.1 km || 
|-id=689 bgcolor=#E9E9E9
| 203689 ||  || — || July 14, 2002 || Palomar || NEAT || — || align=right | 4.5 km || 
|-id=690 bgcolor=#E9E9E9
| 203690 ||  || — || July 14, 2002 || Palomar || NEAT || HNA || align=right | 3.0 km || 
|-id=691 bgcolor=#E9E9E9
| 203691 ||  || — || July 4, 2002 || Palomar || NEAT || — || align=right | 1.9 km || 
|-id=692 bgcolor=#E9E9E9
| 203692 ||  || — || July 8, 2002 || Xinglong || SCAP || GEF || align=right | 2.0 km || 
|-id=693 bgcolor=#E9E9E9
| 203693 ||  || — || July 8, 2002 || Palomar || NEAT || — || align=right | 1.7 km || 
|-id=694 bgcolor=#E9E9E9
| 203694 ||  || — || July 9, 2002 || Palomar || NEAT || — || align=right | 3.8 km || 
|-id=695 bgcolor=#E9E9E9
| 203695 ||  || — || July 9, 2002 || Palomar || NEAT || — || align=right | 3.2 km || 
|-id=696 bgcolor=#E9E9E9
| 203696 ||  || — || July 21, 2002 || Palomar || NEAT || HOF || align=right | 4.1 km || 
|-id=697 bgcolor=#E9E9E9
| 203697 ||  || — || July 17, 2002 || Socorro || LINEAR || — || align=right | 2.2 km || 
|-id=698 bgcolor=#E9E9E9
| 203698 ||  || — || July 18, 2002 || Palomar || NEAT || — || align=right | 3.5 km || 
|-id=699 bgcolor=#E9E9E9
| 203699 ||  || — || July 18, 2002 || Palomar || NEAT || — || align=right | 2.0 km || 
|-id=700 bgcolor=#d6d6d6
| 203700 ||  || — || July 17, 2002 || Palomar || NEAT || — || align=right | 3.0 km || 
|}

203701–203800 

|-bgcolor=#E9E9E9
| 203701 ||  || — || August 6, 2002 || Palomar || NEAT || — || align=right | 2.1 km || 
|-id=702 bgcolor=#E9E9E9
| 203702 ||  || — || August 6, 2002 || Palomar || NEAT || — || align=right | 3.9 km || 
|-id=703 bgcolor=#E9E9E9
| 203703 ||  || — || August 6, 2002 || Campo Imperatore || CINEOS || — || align=right | 2.3 km || 
|-id=704 bgcolor=#E9E9E9
| 203704 ||  || — || August 5, 2002 || Campo Imperatore || CINEOS || HOF || align=right | 3.2 km || 
|-id=705 bgcolor=#E9E9E9
| 203705 ||  || — || August 6, 2002 || Palomar || NEAT || HOF || align=right | 4.0 km || 
|-id=706 bgcolor=#E9E9E9
| 203706 ||  || — || August 13, 2002 || Palomar || NEAT || — || align=right | 3.8 km || 
|-id=707 bgcolor=#d6d6d6
| 203707 ||  || — || August 12, 2002 || Haleakala || NEAT || — || align=right | 4.9 km || 
|-id=708 bgcolor=#d6d6d6
| 203708 ||  || — || August 15, 2002 || Kitt Peak || Spacewatch || — || align=right | 2.9 km || 
|-id=709 bgcolor=#E9E9E9
| 203709 ||  || — || August 14, 2002 || Anderson Mesa || LONEOS || — || align=right | 1.9 km || 
|-id=710 bgcolor=#E9E9E9
| 203710 ||  || — || August 14, 2002 || Socorro || LINEAR || — || align=right | 2.2 km || 
|-id=711 bgcolor=#d6d6d6
| 203711 ||  || — || August 15, 2002 || Socorro || LINEAR || EUP || align=right | 6.6 km || 
|-id=712 bgcolor=#E9E9E9
| 203712 ||  || — || August 8, 2002 || Palomar || S. F. Hönig || AST || align=right | 3.5 km || 
|-id=713 bgcolor=#E9E9E9
| 203713 ||  || — || August 8, 2002 || Palomar || S. F. Hönig || — || align=right | 2.9 km || 
|-id=714 bgcolor=#E9E9E9
| 203714 ||  || — || August 8, 2002 || Palomar || S. F. Hönig || NEM || align=right | 3.2 km || 
|-id=715 bgcolor=#E9E9E9
| 203715 ||  || — || August 8, 2002 || Palomar || S. F. Hönig || — || align=right | 3.9 km || 
|-id=716 bgcolor=#E9E9E9
| 203716 ||  || — || August 8, 2002 || Palomar || S. F. Hönig || — || align=right | 2.8 km || 
|-id=717 bgcolor=#E9E9E9
| 203717 ||  || — || August 11, 2002 || Palomar || NEAT || HEN || align=right | 1.8 km || 
|-id=718 bgcolor=#E9E9E9
| 203718 ||  || — || August 13, 2002 || Kitt Peak || Spacewatch || WIT || align=right | 1.6 km || 
|-id=719 bgcolor=#d6d6d6
| 203719 ||  || — || August 8, 2002 || Palomar || NEAT || — || align=right | 3.2 km || 
|-id=720 bgcolor=#E9E9E9
| 203720 ||  || — || August 15, 2002 || Palomar || NEAT || HEN || align=right | 1.6 km || 
|-id=721 bgcolor=#d6d6d6
| 203721 ||  || — || August 16, 2002 || Palomar || NEAT || LAU || align=right | 1.8 km || 
|-id=722 bgcolor=#d6d6d6
| 203722 ||  || — || August 17, 2002 || Socorro || LINEAR || EUP || align=right | 5.3 km || 
|-id=723 bgcolor=#d6d6d6
| 203723 ||  || — || August 26, 2002 || Palomar || NEAT || — || align=right | 4.1 km || 
|-id=724 bgcolor=#E9E9E9
| 203724 ||  || — || August 27, 2002 || Palomar || NEAT || DOR || align=right | 3.5 km || 
|-id=725 bgcolor=#d6d6d6
| 203725 ||  || — || August 29, 2002 || Palomar || NEAT || — || align=right | 3.2 km || 
|-id=726 bgcolor=#E9E9E9
| 203726 ||  || — || August 29, 2002 || Palomar || NEAT || — || align=right | 4.1 km || 
|-id=727 bgcolor=#FA8072
| 203727 ||  || — || August 30, 2002 || Anderson Mesa || LONEOS || — || align=right | 1.8 km || 
|-id=728 bgcolor=#E9E9E9
| 203728 ||  || — || August 29, 2002 || Palomar || S. F. Hönig || — || align=right | 3.5 km || 
|-id=729 bgcolor=#d6d6d6
| 203729 ||  || — || August 29, 2002 || Palomar || S. F. Hönig || CHA || align=right | 3.2 km || 
|-id=730 bgcolor=#E9E9E9
| 203730 ||  || — || August 29, 2002 || Palomar || S. F. Hönig || — || align=right | 3.1 km || 
|-id=731 bgcolor=#E9E9E9
| 203731 ||  || — || August 28, 2002 || Palomar || NEAT || MAR || align=right | 1.6 km || 
|-id=732 bgcolor=#E9E9E9
| 203732 ||  || — || August 26, 2002 || Palomar || NEAT || — || align=right | 3.4 km || 
|-id=733 bgcolor=#E9E9E9
| 203733 ||  || — || August 28, 2002 || Palomar || NEAT || — || align=right | 2.9 km || 
|-id=734 bgcolor=#E9E9E9
| 203734 ||  || — || August 30, 2002 || Palomar || NEAT || — || align=right | 3.4 km || 
|-id=735 bgcolor=#E9E9E9
| 203735 ||  || — || August 18, 2002 || Palomar || NEAT || AST || align=right | 3.2 km || 
|-id=736 bgcolor=#E9E9E9
| 203736 ||  || — || August 19, 2002 || Palomar || NEAT || AST || align=right | 1.9 km || 
|-id=737 bgcolor=#E9E9E9
| 203737 ||  || — || August 17, 2002 || Palomar || NEAT || — || align=right | 2.6 km || 
|-id=738 bgcolor=#d6d6d6
| 203738 ||  || — || August 27, 2002 || Palomar || NEAT || — || align=right | 3.0 km || 
|-id=739 bgcolor=#d6d6d6
| 203739 ||  || — || August 30, 2002 || Palomar || NEAT || CHA || align=right | 2.8 km || 
|-id=740 bgcolor=#E9E9E9
| 203740 ||  || — || August 18, 2002 || Palomar || NEAT || AGN || align=right | 2.9 km || 
|-id=741 bgcolor=#E9E9E9
| 203741 ||  || — || August 18, 2002 || Palomar || NEAT || — || align=right | 2.8 km || 
|-id=742 bgcolor=#E9E9E9
| 203742 ||  || — || August 17, 2002 || Palomar || NEAT || — || align=right | 3.3 km || 
|-id=743 bgcolor=#E9E9E9
| 203743 ||  || — || August 17, 2002 || Palomar || NEAT || — || align=right | 2.5 km || 
|-id=744 bgcolor=#E9E9E9
| 203744 ||  || — || August 29, 2002 || Palomar || NEAT || AGN || align=right | 1.7 km || 
|-id=745 bgcolor=#d6d6d6
| 203745 ||  || — || September 4, 2002 || Anderson Mesa || LONEOS || TRP || align=right | 5.7 km || 
|-id=746 bgcolor=#d6d6d6
| 203746 ||  || — || September 4, 2002 || Anderson Mesa || LONEOS || — || align=right | 3.7 km || 
|-id=747 bgcolor=#d6d6d6
| 203747 ||  || — || September 5, 2002 || Socorro || LINEAR || — || align=right | 6.1 km || 
|-id=748 bgcolor=#E9E9E9
| 203748 ||  || — || September 5, 2002 || Anderson Mesa || LONEOS || — || align=right | 4.8 km || 
|-id=749 bgcolor=#d6d6d6
| 203749 ||  || — || September 5, 2002 || Anderson Mesa || LONEOS || — || align=right | 4.8 km || 
|-id=750 bgcolor=#d6d6d6
| 203750 ||  || — || September 4, 2002 || Anderson Mesa || LONEOS || KOR || align=right | 2.5 km || 
|-id=751 bgcolor=#E9E9E9
| 203751 ||  || — || September 5, 2002 || Socorro || LINEAR || HEN || align=right | 1.5 km || 
|-id=752 bgcolor=#d6d6d6
| 203752 ||  || — || September 5, 2002 || Socorro || LINEAR || — || align=right | 5.2 km || 
|-id=753 bgcolor=#d6d6d6
| 203753 ||  || — || September 2, 2002 || Kvistaberg || UDAS || EMA || align=right | 4.1 km || 
|-id=754 bgcolor=#d6d6d6
| 203754 ||  || — || September 9, 2002 || Haleakala || NEAT || — || align=right | 5.6 km || 
|-id=755 bgcolor=#E9E9E9
| 203755 ||  || — || September 10, 2002 || Palomar || NEAT || — || align=right | 2.6 km || 
|-id=756 bgcolor=#d6d6d6
| 203756 ||  || — || September 10, 2002 || Palomar || NEAT || — || align=right | 5.0 km || 
|-id=757 bgcolor=#d6d6d6
| 203757 ||  || — || September 11, 2002 || Palomar || NEAT || — || align=right | 2.9 km || 
|-id=758 bgcolor=#d6d6d6
| 203758 ||  || — || September 12, 2002 || Palomar || NEAT || EOS || align=right | 3.3 km || 
|-id=759 bgcolor=#d6d6d6
| 203759 ||  || — || September 12, 2002 || Palomar || NEAT || KOR || align=right | 2.0 km || 
|-id=760 bgcolor=#d6d6d6
| 203760 ||  || — || September 13, 2002 || Palomar || NEAT || KOR || align=right | 1.9 km || 
|-id=761 bgcolor=#d6d6d6
| 203761 ||  || — || September 13, 2002 || Palomar || NEAT || — || align=right | 3.1 km || 
|-id=762 bgcolor=#d6d6d6
| 203762 ||  || — || September 13, 2002 || Anderson Mesa || LONEOS || — || align=right | 4.8 km || 
|-id=763 bgcolor=#E9E9E9
| 203763 ||  || — || September 13, 2002 || Palomar || NEAT || HOF || align=right | 5.3 km || 
|-id=764 bgcolor=#d6d6d6
| 203764 ||  || — || September 12, 2002 || Palomar || NEAT || KOR || align=right | 1.6 km || 
|-id=765 bgcolor=#E9E9E9
| 203765 ||  || — || September 12, 2002 || Palomar || NEAT || — || align=right | 3.4 km || 
|-id=766 bgcolor=#d6d6d6
| 203766 ||  || — || September 13, 2002 || Palomar || NEAT || — || align=right | 4.1 km || 
|-id=767 bgcolor=#d6d6d6
| 203767 ||  || — || September 15, 2002 || Haleakala || NEAT || — || align=right | 4.5 km || 
|-id=768 bgcolor=#E9E9E9
| 203768 ||  || — || September 14, 2002 || Palomar || NEAT || — || align=right | 2.8 km || 
|-id=769 bgcolor=#d6d6d6
| 203769 ||  || — || September 15, 2002 || Palomar || NEAT || KOR || align=right | 2.3 km || 
|-id=770 bgcolor=#E9E9E9
| 203770 ||  || — || September 15, 2002 || Haleakala || NEAT || MRX || align=right | 1.7 km || 
|-id=771 bgcolor=#d6d6d6
| 203771 ||  || — || September 14, 2002 || Palomar || R. Matson || KOR || align=right | 2.3 km || 
|-id=772 bgcolor=#d6d6d6
| 203772 ||  || — || September 4, 2002 || Palomar || NEAT || — || align=right | 5.4 km || 
|-id=773 bgcolor=#d6d6d6
| 203773 Magyarics ||  ||  || September 14, 2002 || Palomar || NEAT || — || align=right | 3.4 km || 
|-id=774 bgcolor=#d6d6d6
| 203774 ||  || — || September 27, 2002 || Palomar || NEAT || — || align=right | 3.7 km || 
|-id=775 bgcolor=#d6d6d6
| 203775 ||  || — || September 27, 2002 || Palomar || NEAT || — || align=right | 3.1 km || 
|-id=776 bgcolor=#E9E9E9
| 203776 ||  || — || September 29, 2002 || Haleakala || NEAT || — || align=right | 4.7 km || 
|-id=777 bgcolor=#d6d6d6
| 203777 ||  || — || September 30, 2002 || Socorro || LINEAR || — || align=right | 4.1 km || 
|-id=778 bgcolor=#d6d6d6
| 203778 ||  || — || September 28, 2002 || Haleakala || NEAT || — || align=right | 3.9 km || 
|-id=779 bgcolor=#d6d6d6
| 203779 ||  || — || September 26, 2002 || Palomar || NEAT || — || align=right | 2.7 km || 
|-id=780 bgcolor=#d6d6d6
| 203780 ||  || — || September 26, 2002 || Palomar || NEAT || KOR || align=right | 1.9 km || 
|-id=781 bgcolor=#d6d6d6
| 203781 ||  || — || September 26, 2002 || Palomar || NEAT || — || align=right | 3.0 km || 
|-id=782 bgcolor=#d6d6d6
| 203782 || 2002 TU || — || October 1, 2002 || Anderson Mesa || LONEOS || — || align=right | 4.2 km || 
|-id=783 bgcolor=#E9E9E9
| 203783 || 2002 TZ || — || October 1, 2002 || Anderson Mesa || LONEOS || — || align=right | 3.4 km || 
|-id=784 bgcolor=#d6d6d6
| 203784 ||  || — || October 1, 2002 || Anderson Mesa || LONEOS || — || align=right | 4.1 km || 
|-id=785 bgcolor=#d6d6d6
| 203785 ||  || — || October 1, 2002 || Anderson Mesa || LONEOS || — || align=right | 3.6 km || 
|-id=786 bgcolor=#E9E9E9
| 203786 ||  || — || October 1, 2002 || Anderson Mesa || LONEOS || AGN || align=right | 2.1 km || 
|-id=787 bgcolor=#d6d6d6
| 203787 ||  || — || October 2, 2002 || Socorro || LINEAR || — || align=right | 3.1 km || 
|-id=788 bgcolor=#d6d6d6
| 203788 ||  || — || October 2, 2002 || Socorro || LINEAR || Tj (2.95) || align=right | 6.3 km || 
|-id=789 bgcolor=#d6d6d6
| 203789 ||  || — || October 2, 2002 || Socorro || LINEAR || — || align=right | 5.5 km || 
|-id=790 bgcolor=#d6d6d6
| 203790 ||  || — || October 2, 2002 || Socorro || LINEAR || HYG || align=right | 4.1 km || 
|-id=791 bgcolor=#d6d6d6
| 203791 ||  || — || October 3, 2002 || Campo Imperatore || CINEOS || — || align=right | 3.3 km || 
|-id=792 bgcolor=#d6d6d6
| 203792 ||  || — || October 7, 2002 || Anderson Mesa || LONEOS || EOS || align=right | 3.6 km || 
|-id=793 bgcolor=#d6d6d6
| 203793 ||  || — || October 3, 2002 || Palomar || NEAT || EOS || align=right | 3.9 km || 
|-id=794 bgcolor=#d6d6d6
| 203794 ||  || — || October 2, 2002 || Haleakala || NEAT || — || align=right | 4.2 km || 
|-id=795 bgcolor=#d6d6d6
| 203795 ||  || — || October 3, 2002 || Palomar || NEAT || — || align=right | 3.3 km || 
|-id=796 bgcolor=#d6d6d6
| 203796 ||  || — || October 3, 2002 || Socorro || LINEAR || KOR || align=right | 2.3 km || 
|-id=797 bgcolor=#d6d6d6
| 203797 ||  || — || October 2, 2002 || Socorro || LINEAR || KAR || align=right | 1.6 km || 
|-id=798 bgcolor=#d6d6d6
| 203798 ||  || — || October 4, 2002 || Socorro || LINEAR || EOS || align=right | 3.0 km || 
|-id=799 bgcolor=#d6d6d6
| 203799 ||  || — || October 1, 2002 || Anderson Mesa || LONEOS || — || align=right | 4.9 km || 
|-id=800 bgcolor=#d6d6d6
| 203800 ||  || — || October 2, 2002 || Haleakala || NEAT || SAN || align=right | 2.7 km || 
|}

203801–203900 

|-bgcolor=#E9E9E9
| 203801 ||  || — || October 3, 2002 || Palomar || NEAT || GEF || align=right | 2.4 km || 
|-id=802 bgcolor=#d6d6d6
| 203802 ||  || — || October 3, 2002 || Palomar || NEAT || — || align=right | 5.2 km || 
|-id=803 bgcolor=#d6d6d6
| 203803 ||  || — || October 3, 2002 || Palomar || NEAT || EOS || align=right | 3.6 km || 
|-id=804 bgcolor=#d6d6d6
| 203804 ||  || — || October 3, 2002 || Palomar || NEAT || — || align=right | 3.8 km || 
|-id=805 bgcolor=#d6d6d6
| 203805 ||  || — || October 3, 2002 || Palomar || NEAT || — || align=right | 5.6 km || 
|-id=806 bgcolor=#E9E9E9
| 203806 ||  || — || October 3, 2002 || Campo Imperatore || CINEOS || MAR || align=right | 1.8 km || 
|-id=807 bgcolor=#d6d6d6
| 203807 ||  || — || October 4, 2002 || Socorro || LINEAR || CHA || align=right | 3.4 km || 
|-id=808 bgcolor=#d6d6d6
| 203808 ||  || — || October 5, 2002 || Socorro || LINEAR || — || align=right | 5.5 km || 
|-id=809 bgcolor=#d6d6d6
| 203809 ||  || — || October 11, 2002 || Palomar || NEAT || — || align=right | 5.9 km || 
|-id=810 bgcolor=#d6d6d6
| 203810 ||  || — || October 1, 2002 || Socorro || LINEAR || FIR || align=right | 9.1 km || 
|-id=811 bgcolor=#d6d6d6
| 203811 ||  || — || October 1, 2002 || Socorro || LINEAR || — || align=right | 5.4 km || 
|-id=812 bgcolor=#d6d6d6
| 203812 ||  || — || October 4, 2002 || Socorro || LINEAR || — || align=right | 4.9 km || 
|-id=813 bgcolor=#d6d6d6
| 203813 ||  || — || October 6, 2002 || Socorro || LINEAR || — || align=right | 4.7 km || 
|-id=814 bgcolor=#d6d6d6
| 203814 ||  || — || October 6, 2002 || Socorro || LINEAR || — || align=right | 4.4 km || 
|-id=815 bgcolor=#d6d6d6
| 203815 ||  || — || October 6, 2002 || Socorro || LINEAR || URS || align=right | 6.1 km || 
|-id=816 bgcolor=#d6d6d6
| 203816 ||  || — || October 6, 2002 || Socorro || LINEAR || AEG || align=right | 7.2 km || 
|-id=817 bgcolor=#d6d6d6
| 203817 ||  || — || October 6, 2002 || Socorro || LINEAR || — || align=right | 6.3 km || 
|-id=818 bgcolor=#d6d6d6
| 203818 ||  || — || October 6, 2002 || Socorro || LINEAR || — || align=right | 6.9 km || 
|-id=819 bgcolor=#d6d6d6
| 203819 ||  || — || October 7, 2002 || Socorro || LINEAR || slow || align=right | 5.0 km || 
|-id=820 bgcolor=#d6d6d6
| 203820 ||  || — || October 10, 2002 || Palomar || NEAT || — || align=right | 3.8 km || 
|-id=821 bgcolor=#d6d6d6
| 203821 ||  || — || October 10, 2002 || Socorro || LINEAR || — || align=right | 6.2 km || 
|-id=822 bgcolor=#d6d6d6
| 203822 ||  || — || October 10, 2002 || Socorro || LINEAR || — || align=right | 6.1 km || 
|-id=823 bgcolor=#d6d6d6
| 203823 Zdanavicius ||  ||  || October 5, 2002 || Palomar || K. Černis || — || align=right | 3.3 km || 
|-id=824 bgcolor=#d6d6d6
| 203824 ||  || — || October 5, 2002 || Apache Point || SDSS || — || align=right | 3.3 km || 
|-id=825 bgcolor=#d6d6d6
| 203825 ||  || — || October 10, 2002 || Apache Point || SDSS || KOR || align=right | 1.6 km || 
|-id=826 bgcolor=#d6d6d6
| 203826 ||  || — || October 5, 2002 || Palomar || NEAT || — || align=right | 6.6 km || 
|-id=827 bgcolor=#d6d6d6
| 203827 ||  || — || October 28, 2002 || Socorro || LINEAR || — || align=right | 9.0 km || 
|-id=828 bgcolor=#d6d6d6
| 203828 ||  || — || October 30, 2002 || Haleakala || NEAT || — || align=right | 4.4 km || 
|-id=829 bgcolor=#d6d6d6
| 203829 ||  || — || October 31, 2002 || Socorro || LINEAR || — || align=right | 4.5 km || 
|-id=830 bgcolor=#d6d6d6
| 203830 ||  || — || October 31, 2002 || Palomar || NEAT || — || align=right | 3.6 km || 
|-id=831 bgcolor=#d6d6d6
| 203831 ||  || — || October 31, 2002 || Palomar || NEAT || — || align=right | 4.3 km || 
|-id=832 bgcolor=#d6d6d6
| 203832 ||  || — || October 30, 2002 || Apache Point || SDSS || EOS || align=right | 2.1 km || 
|-id=833 bgcolor=#d6d6d6
| 203833 ||  || — || November 5, 2002 || Socorro || LINEAR || — || align=right | 5.5 km || 
|-id=834 bgcolor=#d6d6d6
| 203834 ||  || — || November 5, 2002 || Socorro || LINEAR || TIR || align=right | 6.5 km || 
|-id=835 bgcolor=#d6d6d6
| 203835 ||  || — || November 5, 2002 || Socorro || LINEAR || ALA || align=right | 5.2 km || 
|-id=836 bgcolor=#d6d6d6
| 203836 ||  || — || November 5, 2002 || Anderson Mesa || LONEOS || — || align=right | 4.6 km || 
|-id=837 bgcolor=#d6d6d6
| 203837 ||  || — || November 5, 2002 || Palomar || NEAT || — || align=right | 4.4 km || 
|-id=838 bgcolor=#d6d6d6
| 203838 ||  || — || November 5, 2002 || Palomar || NEAT || — || align=right | 3.7 km || 
|-id=839 bgcolor=#d6d6d6
| 203839 ||  || — || November 6, 2002 || Socorro || LINEAR || HYG || align=right | 3.8 km || 
|-id=840 bgcolor=#d6d6d6
| 203840 ||  || — || November 6, 2002 || Socorro || LINEAR || — || align=right | 5.7 km || 
|-id=841 bgcolor=#d6d6d6
| 203841 ||  || — || November 6, 2002 || Socorro || LINEAR || THM || align=right | 3.6 km || 
|-id=842 bgcolor=#d6d6d6
| 203842 ||  || — || November 6, 2002 || Socorro || LINEAR || EOS || align=right | 4.0 km || 
|-id=843 bgcolor=#d6d6d6
| 203843 ||  || — || November 6, 2002 || Anderson Mesa || LONEOS || — || align=right | 4.6 km || 
|-id=844 bgcolor=#d6d6d6
| 203844 ||  || — || November 5, 2002 || Socorro || LINEAR || — || align=right | 4.7 km || 
|-id=845 bgcolor=#d6d6d6
| 203845 ||  || — || November 5, 2002 || Palomar || NEAT || HYG || align=right | 4.0 km || 
|-id=846 bgcolor=#d6d6d6
| 203846 ||  || — || November 6, 2002 || Anderson Mesa || LONEOS || — || align=right | 6.5 km || 
|-id=847 bgcolor=#d6d6d6
| 203847 ||  || — || November 11, 2002 || Anderson Mesa || LONEOS || HYG || align=right | 4.9 km || 
|-id=848 bgcolor=#d6d6d6
| 203848 ||  || — || November 11, 2002 || Anderson Mesa || LONEOS || — || align=right | 7.2 km || 
|-id=849 bgcolor=#d6d6d6
| 203849 ||  || — || November 11, 2002 || Socorro || LINEAR || — || align=right | 4.9 km || 
|-id=850 bgcolor=#d6d6d6
| 203850 ||  || — || November 11, 2002 || Palomar || NEAT || — || align=right | 4.3 km || 
|-id=851 bgcolor=#d6d6d6
| 203851 ||  || — || November 11, 2002 || Anderson Mesa || LONEOS || — || align=right | 6.1 km || 
|-id=852 bgcolor=#d6d6d6
| 203852 ||  || — || November 12, 2002 || Socorro || LINEAR || EOS || align=right | 3.2 km || 
|-id=853 bgcolor=#d6d6d6
| 203853 ||  || — || November 13, 2002 || Palomar || NEAT || — || align=right | 4.5 km || 
|-id=854 bgcolor=#d6d6d6
| 203854 ||  || — || November 12, 2002 || Palomar || NEAT || — || align=right | 5.7 km || 
|-id=855 bgcolor=#d6d6d6
| 203855 ||  || — || November 13, 2002 || Palomar || NEAT || — || align=right | 4.7 km || 
|-id=856 bgcolor=#d6d6d6
| 203856 ||  || — || November 14, 2002 || Socorro || LINEAR || — || align=right | 3.7 km || 
|-id=857 bgcolor=#d6d6d6
| 203857 ||  || — || November 12, 2002 || Socorro || LINEAR || — || align=right | 7.0 km || 
|-id=858 bgcolor=#d6d6d6
| 203858 ||  || — || November 5, 2002 || Socorro || LINEAR || — || align=right | 5.6 km || 
|-id=859 bgcolor=#d6d6d6
| 203859 ||  || — || November 15, 2002 || Palomar || NEAT || HYG || align=right | 3.9 km || 
|-id=860 bgcolor=#d6d6d6
| 203860 ||  || — || November 6, 2002 || Palomar || NEAT || EUP || align=right | 6.4 km || 
|-id=861 bgcolor=#d6d6d6
| 203861 ||  || — || November 23, 2002 || Palomar || NEAT || HYG || align=right | 4.4 km || 
|-id=862 bgcolor=#d6d6d6
| 203862 ||  || — || November 24, 2002 || Palomar || NEAT || — || align=right | 5.9 km || 
|-id=863 bgcolor=#d6d6d6
| 203863 ||  || — || November 27, 2002 || Anderson Mesa || LONEOS || — || align=right | 4.8 km || 
|-id=864 bgcolor=#d6d6d6
| 203864 ||  || — || November 30, 2002 || Socorro || LINEAR || EUP || align=right | 6.5 km || 
|-id=865 bgcolor=#C2FFFF
| 203865 ||  || — || November 16, 2002 || Palomar || NEAT || L5 || align=right | 11 km || 
|-id=866 bgcolor=#d6d6d6
| 203866 || 2002 XF || — || December 1, 2002 || Emerald Lane || L. Ball || EOS || align=right | 3.0 km || 
|-id=867 bgcolor=#d6d6d6
| 203867 || 2002 XZ || — || December 1, 2002 || Haleakala || NEAT || — || align=right | 5.2 km || 
|-id=868 bgcolor=#d6d6d6
| 203868 ||  || — || December 5, 2002 || Socorro || LINEAR || — || align=right | 7.3 km || 
|-id=869 bgcolor=#d6d6d6
| 203869 ||  || — || December 2, 2002 || Socorro || LINEAR || — || align=right | 4.4 km || 
|-id=870 bgcolor=#d6d6d6
| 203870 ||  || — || December 2, 2002 || Socorro || LINEAR || — || align=right | 3.8 km || 
|-id=871 bgcolor=#d6d6d6
| 203871 ||  || — || December 5, 2002 || Socorro || LINEAR || — || align=right | 5.2 km || 
|-id=872 bgcolor=#d6d6d6
| 203872 ||  || — || December 9, 2002 || Desert Eagle || W. K. Y. Yeung || — || align=right | 3.8 km || 
|-id=873 bgcolor=#d6d6d6
| 203873 ||  || — || December 6, 2002 || Socorro || LINEAR || EOS || align=right | 5.3 km || 
|-id=874 bgcolor=#d6d6d6
| 203874 ||  || — || December 10, 2002 || Socorro || LINEAR || THM || align=right | 3.8 km || 
|-id=875 bgcolor=#d6d6d6
| 203875 ||  || — || December 11, 2002 || Socorro || LINEAR || MEL || align=right | 6.6 km || 
|-id=876 bgcolor=#d6d6d6
| 203876 ||  || — || December 5, 2002 || Socorro || LINEAR || — || align=right | 3.9 km || 
|-id=877 bgcolor=#d6d6d6
| 203877 ||  || — || December 5, 2002 || Socorro || LINEAR || — || align=right | 3.7 km || 
|-id=878 bgcolor=#fefefe
| 203878 ||  || — || December 28, 2002 || Nashville || R. Clingan || — || align=right data-sort-value="0.94" | 940 m || 
|-id=879 bgcolor=#d6d6d6
| 203879 ||  || — || December 31, 2002 || Socorro || LINEAR || THM || align=right | 3.3 km || 
|-id=880 bgcolor=#d6d6d6
| 203880 ||  || — || January 2, 2003 || Socorro || LINEAR || — || align=right | 6.5 km || 
|-id=881 bgcolor=#d6d6d6
| 203881 ||  || — || January 7, 2003 || Socorro || LINEAR || — || align=right | 5.3 km || 
|-id=882 bgcolor=#d6d6d6
| 203882 ||  || — || January 7, 2003 || Socorro || LINEAR || — || align=right | 5.3 km || 
|-id=883 bgcolor=#d6d6d6
| 203883 ||  || — || January 26, 2003 || Haleakala || NEAT || VER || align=right | 4.7 km || 
|-id=884 bgcolor=#d6d6d6
| 203884 ||  || — || January 26, 2003 || Palomar || NEAT || EUP || align=right | 7.1 km || 
|-id=885 bgcolor=#fefefe
| 203885 ||  || — || January 28, 2003 || Socorro || LINEAR || — || align=right | 1.3 km || 
|-id=886 bgcolor=#d6d6d6
| 203886 ||  || — || January 31, 2003 || Socorro || LINEAR || EUP || align=right | 7.8 km || 
|-id=887 bgcolor=#d6d6d6
| 203887 ||  || — || February 23, 2003 || Anderson Mesa || LONEOS || — || align=right | 4.4 km || 
|-id=888 bgcolor=#fefefe
| 203888 ||  || — || March 6, 2003 || Palomar || NEAT || — || align=right data-sort-value="0.95" | 950 m || 
|-id=889 bgcolor=#fefefe
| 203889 ||  || — || March 10, 2003 || Campo Imperatore || CINEOS || NYS || align=right | 1.3 km || 
|-id=890 bgcolor=#fefefe
| 203890 ||  || — || March 24, 2003 || Kitt Peak || Spacewatch || EUT || align=right | 1.1 km || 
|-id=891 bgcolor=#C2FFFF
| 203891 ||  || — || March 23, 2003 || Kitt Peak || Spacewatch || L4 || align=right | 14 km || 
|-id=892 bgcolor=#fefefe
| 203892 ||  || — || March 26, 2003 || Palomar || NEAT || FLO || align=right data-sort-value="0.92" | 920 m || 
|-id=893 bgcolor=#fefefe
| 203893 ||  || — || March 26, 2003 || Palomar || NEAT || — || align=right | 1.3 km || 
|-id=894 bgcolor=#fefefe
| 203894 ||  || — || March 23, 2003 || Kitt Peak || Spacewatch || — || align=right | 1.7 km || 
|-id=895 bgcolor=#fefefe
| 203895 ||  || — || March 26, 2003 || Anderson Mesa || LONEOS || MAS || align=right | 1.2 km || 
|-id=896 bgcolor=#fefefe
| 203896 ||  || — || April 8, 2003 || Haleakala || NEAT || NYS || align=right | 1.2 km || 
|-id=897 bgcolor=#fefefe
| 203897 || 2003 HD || — || April 21, 2003 || Siding Spring || Siding Spring Obs. || — || align=right data-sort-value="0.96" | 960 m || 
|-id=898 bgcolor=#fefefe
| 203898 ||  || — || April 25, 2003 || Campo Imperatore || CINEOS || — || align=right | 2.0 km || 
|-id=899 bgcolor=#fefefe
| 203899 ||  || — || April 27, 2003 || Anderson Mesa || LONEOS || NYS || align=right data-sort-value="0.97" | 970 m || 
|-id=900 bgcolor=#fefefe
| 203900 ||  || — || April 24, 2003 || Campo Imperatore || CINEOS || NYS || align=right data-sort-value="0.88" | 880 m || 
|}

203901–204000 

|-bgcolor=#fefefe
| 203901 ||  || — || April 25, 2003 || Kitt Peak || Spacewatch || NYS || align=right | 2.1 km || 
|-id=902 bgcolor=#fefefe
| 203902 ||  || — || April 26, 2003 || Kitt Peak || Spacewatch || — || align=right | 1.2 km || 
|-id=903 bgcolor=#fefefe
| 203903 ||  || — || April 28, 2003 || Socorro || LINEAR || FLO || align=right | 1.0 km || 
|-id=904 bgcolor=#fefefe
| 203904 ||  || — || April 28, 2003 || Socorro || LINEAR || — || align=right | 1.0 km || 
|-id=905 bgcolor=#fefefe
| 203905 ||  || — || April 26, 2003 || Haleakala || NEAT || ERI || align=right | 2.2 km || 
|-id=906 bgcolor=#fefefe
| 203906 ||  || — || April 29, 2003 || Haleakala || NEAT || — || align=right | 1.5 km || 
|-id=907 bgcolor=#fefefe
| 203907 ||  || — || April 30, 2003 || Socorro || LINEAR || — || align=right | 1.6 km || 
|-id=908 bgcolor=#fefefe
| 203908 ||  || — || April 28, 2003 || Socorro || LINEAR || — || align=right | 3.1 km || 
|-id=909 bgcolor=#fefefe
| 203909 ||  || — || April 29, 2003 || Kitt Peak || Spacewatch || FLO || align=right data-sort-value="0.94" | 940 m || 
|-id=910 bgcolor=#fefefe
| 203910 ||  || — || April 30, 2003 || Socorro || LINEAR || FLO || align=right data-sort-value="0.98" | 980 m || 
|-id=911 bgcolor=#fefefe
| 203911 ||  || — || May 2, 2003 || Socorro || LINEAR || — || align=right | 1.3 km || 
|-id=912 bgcolor=#fefefe
| 203912 ||  || — || May 9, 2003 || Socorro || LINEAR || — || align=right | 1.4 km || 
|-id=913 bgcolor=#E9E9E9
| 203913 ||  || — || June 22, 2003 || Anderson Mesa || LONEOS || — || align=right | 3.1 km || 
|-id=914 bgcolor=#fefefe
| 203914 ||  || — || June 28, 2003 || Socorro || LINEAR || — || align=right | 1.7 km || 
|-id=915 bgcolor=#fefefe
| 203915 ||  || — || July 22, 2003 || Campo Imperatore || CINEOS || NYS || align=right | 1.1 km || 
|-id=916 bgcolor=#fefefe
| 203916 ||  || — || July 22, 2003 || Haleakala || NEAT || FLO || align=right | 1.1 km || 
|-id=917 bgcolor=#E9E9E9
| 203917 ||  || — || July 22, 2003 || Campo Imperatore || CINEOS || ADE || align=right | 4.3 km || 
|-id=918 bgcolor=#E9E9E9
| 203918 ||  || — || July 25, 2003 || Palomar || NEAT || — || align=right | 4.7 km || 
|-id=919 bgcolor=#fefefe
| 203919 ||  || — || July 27, 2003 || Reedy Creek || J. Broughton || ERI || align=right | 2.6 km || 
|-id=920 bgcolor=#E9E9E9
| 203920 ||  || — || July 27, 2003 || Reedy Creek || J. Broughton || — || align=right | 2.0 km || 
|-id=921 bgcolor=#E9E9E9
| 203921 ||  || — || July 23, 2003 || Palomar || NEAT || — || align=right | 3.0 km || 
|-id=922 bgcolor=#fefefe
| 203922 ||  || — || July 29, 2003 || Campo Imperatore || CINEOS || — || align=right | 1.0 km || 
|-id=923 bgcolor=#fefefe
| 203923 ||  || — || July 31, 2003 || Reedy Creek || J. Broughton || MAS || align=right | 1.2 km || 
|-id=924 bgcolor=#fefefe
| 203924 ||  || — || July 24, 2003 || Palomar || NEAT || — || align=right | 1.6 km || 
|-id=925 bgcolor=#fefefe
| 203925 ||  || — || July 24, 2003 || Palomar || NEAT || NYS || align=right data-sort-value="0.96" | 960 m || 
|-id=926 bgcolor=#E9E9E9
| 203926 ||  || — || July 30, 2003 || Campo Imperatore || CINEOS || EUN || align=right | 1.6 km || 
|-id=927 bgcolor=#fefefe
| 203927 ||  || — || August 3, 2003 || Norma Rose || J. Riffle, W. K. Y. Yeung || SUL || align=right | 2.5 km || 
|-id=928 bgcolor=#fefefe
| 203928 ||  || — || August 2, 2003 || Haleakala || NEAT || — || align=right | 1.6 km || 
|-id=929 bgcolor=#fefefe
| 203929 ||  || — || August 20, 2003 || Palomar || NEAT || V || align=right | 1.1 km || 
|-id=930 bgcolor=#fefefe
| 203930 ||  || — || August 22, 2003 || Palomar || NEAT || NYS || align=right | 1.2 km || 
|-id=931 bgcolor=#fefefe
| 203931 ||  || — || August 22, 2003 || Palomar || NEAT || — || align=right | 1.6 km || 
|-id=932 bgcolor=#E9E9E9
| 203932 ||  || — || August 22, 2003 || Palomar || NEAT || — || align=right | 1.5 km || 
|-id=933 bgcolor=#E9E9E9
| 203933 ||  || — || August 21, 2003 || Palomar || NEAT || — || align=right | 1.4 km || 
|-id=934 bgcolor=#E9E9E9
| 203934 ||  || — || August 22, 2003 || Socorro || LINEAR || JUN || align=right | 1.5 km || 
|-id=935 bgcolor=#E9E9E9
| 203935 ||  || — || August 22, 2003 || Palomar || NEAT || — || align=right | 1.4 km || 
|-id=936 bgcolor=#E9E9E9
| 203936 ||  || — || August 22, 2003 || Socorro || LINEAR || — || align=right | 1.2 km || 
|-id=937 bgcolor=#E9E9E9
| 203937 ||  || — || August 23, 2003 || Socorro || LINEAR || — || align=right | 3.4 km || 
|-id=938 bgcolor=#E9E9E9
| 203938 ||  || — || August 25, 2003 || Palomar || NEAT || — || align=right | 2.9 km || 
|-id=939 bgcolor=#fefefe
| 203939 ||  || — || August 26, 2003 || Črni Vrh || H. Mikuž || NYS || align=right data-sort-value="0.98" | 980 m || 
|-id=940 bgcolor=#E9E9E9
| 203940 ||  || — || August 24, 2003 || Socorro || LINEAR || EUN || align=right | 2.5 km || 
|-id=941 bgcolor=#E9E9E9
| 203941 ||  || — || August 24, 2003 || Socorro || LINEAR || — || align=right | 2.5 km || 
|-id=942 bgcolor=#E9E9E9
| 203942 ||  || — || August 25, 2003 || Haleakala || NEAT || — || align=right | 4.4 km || 
|-id=943 bgcolor=#E9E9E9
| 203943 ||  || — || August 30, 2003 || Socorro || LINEAR || — || align=right | 2.5 km || 
|-id=944 bgcolor=#E9E9E9
| 203944 ||  || — || August 31, 2003 || Haleakala || NEAT || RAF || align=right | 1.4 km || 
|-id=945 bgcolor=#E9E9E9
| 203945 ||  || — || August 23, 2003 || Palomar || NEAT || EUN || align=right | 1.4 km || 
|-id=946 bgcolor=#E9E9E9
| 203946 ||  || — || September 3, 2003 || Socorro || LINEAR || — || align=right | 2.6 km || 
|-id=947 bgcolor=#E9E9E9
| 203947 ||  || — || September 1, 2003 || Socorro || LINEAR || — || align=right | 5.3 km || 
|-id=948 bgcolor=#E9E9E9
| 203948 ||  || — || September 13, 2003 || Haleakala || NEAT || — || align=right | 3.1 km || 
|-id=949 bgcolor=#E9E9E9
| 203949 ||  || — || September 15, 2003 || Haleakala || NEAT || — || align=right | 2.9 km || 
|-id=950 bgcolor=#E9E9E9
| 203950 ||  || — || September 16, 2003 || Palomar || NEAT || — || align=right | 4.9 km || 
|-id=951 bgcolor=#E9E9E9
| 203951 ||  || — || September 16, 2003 || Kitt Peak || Spacewatch || — || align=right | 1.00 km || 
|-id=952 bgcolor=#E9E9E9
| 203952 ||  || — || September 17, 2003 || Socorro || LINEAR || MAR || align=right | 2.1 km || 
|-id=953 bgcolor=#E9E9E9
| 203953 ||  || — || September 17, 2003 || Palomar || NEAT || EUN || align=right | 1.9 km || 
|-id=954 bgcolor=#E9E9E9
| 203954 ||  || — || September 16, 2003 || Palomar || NEAT || — || align=right | 1.7 km || 
|-id=955 bgcolor=#E9E9E9
| 203955 ||  || — || September 18, 2003 || Kitt Peak || Spacewatch || — || align=right | 3.2 km || 
|-id=956 bgcolor=#E9E9E9
| 203956 ||  || — || September 17, 2003 || Campo Imperatore || CINEOS || JUN || align=right | 1.5 km || 
|-id=957 bgcolor=#E9E9E9
| 203957 ||  || — || September 17, 2003 || Kitt Peak || Spacewatch || — || align=right | 1.6 km || 
|-id=958 bgcolor=#E9E9E9
| 203958 ||  || — || September 19, 2003 || Kitt Peak || Spacewatch || — || align=right | 4.0 km || 
|-id=959 bgcolor=#E9E9E9
| 203959 ||  || — || September 20, 2003 || Kitt Peak || Spacewatch || EUN || align=right | 1.5 km || 
|-id=960 bgcolor=#E9E9E9
| 203960 ||  || — || September 20, 2003 || Kitt Peak || Spacewatch || — || align=right | 1.2 km || 
|-id=961 bgcolor=#E9E9E9
| 203961 ||  || — || September 18, 2003 || Goodricke-Pigott || R. A. Tucker || — || align=right | 2.0 km || 
|-id=962 bgcolor=#E9E9E9
| 203962 ||  || — || September 18, 2003 || Kitt Peak || Spacewatch || — || align=right | 3.0 km || 
|-id=963 bgcolor=#E9E9E9
| 203963 ||  || — || September 18, 2003 || Kitt Peak || Spacewatch || — || align=right | 1.2 km || 
|-id=964 bgcolor=#E9E9E9
| 203964 ||  || — || September 19, 2003 || Kitt Peak || Spacewatch || — || align=right | 1.9 km || 
|-id=965 bgcolor=#E9E9E9
| 203965 ||  || — || September 18, 2003 || Campo Imperatore || CINEOS || WIT || align=right | 1.5 km || 
|-id=966 bgcolor=#E9E9E9
| 203966 ||  || — || September 20, 2003 || Palomar || NEAT || — || align=right | 3.8 km || 
|-id=967 bgcolor=#E9E9E9
| 203967 ||  || — || September 19, 2003 || Anderson Mesa || LONEOS || — || align=right | 2.6 km || 
|-id=968 bgcolor=#E9E9E9
| 203968 ||  || — || September 19, 2003 || Anderson Mesa || LONEOS || — || align=right | 2.5 km || 
|-id=969 bgcolor=#E9E9E9
| 203969 ||  || — || September 19, 2003 || Anderson Mesa || LONEOS || — || align=right | 2.7 km || 
|-id=970 bgcolor=#E9E9E9
| 203970 ||  || — || September 20, 2003 || Anderson Mesa || LONEOS || — || align=right | 3.5 km || 
|-id=971 bgcolor=#E9E9E9
| 203971 ||  || — || September 18, 2003 || Kitt Peak || Spacewatch || — || align=right | 2.9 km || 
|-id=972 bgcolor=#E9E9E9
| 203972 ||  || — || September 18, 2003 || Palomar || NEAT || — || align=right | 1.1 km || 
|-id=973 bgcolor=#E9E9E9
| 203973 ||  || — || September 20, 2003 || Kitt Peak || Spacewatch || GEF || align=right | 1.9 km || 
|-id=974 bgcolor=#E9E9E9
| 203974 ||  || — || September 25, 2003 || Palomar || NEAT || — || align=right | 2.0 km || 
|-id=975 bgcolor=#E9E9E9
| 203975 ||  || — || September 24, 2003 || Palomar || NEAT || — || align=right | 1.9 km || 
|-id=976 bgcolor=#E9E9E9
| 203976 ||  || — || September 23, 2003 || Palomar || NEAT || — || align=right | 1.9 km || 
|-id=977 bgcolor=#E9E9E9
| 203977 ||  || — || September 25, 2003 || Palomar || NEAT || — || align=right | 3.0 km || 
|-id=978 bgcolor=#E9E9E9
| 203978 ||  || — || September 28, 2003 || Desert Eagle || W. K. Y. Yeung || — || align=right | 3.8 km || 
|-id=979 bgcolor=#E9E9E9
| 203979 ||  || — || September 24, 2003 || Haleakala || NEAT || — || align=right | 3.9 km || 
|-id=980 bgcolor=#E9E9E9
| 203980 ||  || — || September 24, 2003 || Haleakala || NEAT || MRX || align=right | 1.9 km || 
|-id=981 bgcolor=#E9E9E9
| 203981 ||  || — || September 25, 2003 || Palomar || NEAT || — || align=right | 1.3 km || 
|-id=982 bgcolor=#E9E9E9
| 203982 ||  || — || September 27, 2003 || Socorro || LINEAR || MAR || align=right | 1.7 km || 
|-id=983 bgcolor=#E9E9E9
| 203983 ||  || — || September 27, 2003 || Socorro || LINEAR || — || align=right | 2.2 km || 
|-id=984 bgcolor=#E9E9E9
| 203984 ||  || — || September 26, 2003 || Socorro || LINEAR || DOR || align=right | 3.7 km || 
|-id=985 bgcolor=#fefefe
| 203985 ||  || — || September 27, 2003 || Socorro || LINEAR || — || align=right | 1.5 km || 
|-id=986 bgcolor=#d6d6d6
| 203986 ||  || — || September 28, 2003 || Socorro || LINEAR || KOR || align=right | 2.3 km || 
|-id=987 bgcolor=#E9E9E9
| 203987 ||  || — || September 29, 2003 || Kitt Peak || Spacewatch || — || align=right | 1.3 km || 
|-id=988 bgcolor=#E9E9E9
| 203988 ||  || — || September 27, 2003 || Socorro || LINEAR || — || align=right | 1.7 km || 
|-id=989 bgcolor=#E9E9E9
| 203989 ||  || — || September 17, 2003 || Palomar || NEAT || — || align=right | 2.8 km || 
|-id=990 bgcolor=#d6d6d6
| 203990 ||  || — || September 30, 2003 || Socorro || LINEAR || BRA || align=right | 3.3 km || 
|-id=991 bgcolor=#E9E9E9
| 203991 ||  || — || September 22, 2003 || Anderson Mesa || LONEOS || — || align=right | 1.1 km || 
|-id=992 bgcolor=#E9E9E9
| 203992 ||  || — || September 28, 2003 || Socorro || LINEAR || — || align=right | 3.0 km || 
|-id=993 bgcolor=#E9E9E9
| 203993 ||  || — || September 16, 2003 || Kitt Peak || Spacewatch || — || align=right | 1.9 km || 
|-id=994 bgcolor=#E9E9E9
| 203994 ||  || — || October 1, 2003 || Goodricke-Pigott || J. W. Kessel || — || align=right | 4.5 km || 
|-id=995 bgcolor=#E9E9E9
| 203995 ||  || — || October 14, 2003 || Anderson Mesa || LONEOS || DOR || align=right | 3.2 km || 
|-id=996 bgcolor=#E9E9E9
| 203996 ||  || — || October 14, 2003 || Anderson Mesa || LONEOS || — || align=right | 2.6 km || 
|-id=997 bgcolor=#E9E9E9
| 203997 ||  || — || October 15, 2003 || Anderson Mesa || LONEOS || — || align=right | 2.5 km || 
|-id=998 bgcolor=#E9E9E9
| 203998 ||  || — || October 14, 2003 || Palomar || NEAT || — || align=right | 4.4 km || 
|-id=999 bgcolor=#E9E9E9
| 203999 ||  || — || October 15, 2003 || Anderson Mesa || LONEOS || MRX || align=right | 1.8 km || 
|-id=000 bgcolor=#E9E9E9
| 204000 ||  || — || October 1, 2003 || Kitt Peak || Spacewatch || — || align=right | 1.4 km || 
|}

References

External links 
 Discovery Circumstances: Numbered Minor Planets (200001)–(205000) (IAU Minor Planet Center)

0203